= Yeh Chi Yun =

Chinese newspaperman and poet

Yeh Chih Yun (21 July 1859 - 9 September 1921), also known as Ye Mao Bin, Ye Ji Yin, Yong Wen, Ting Song Lu Shi Sun and Xing Er Sheng, was a Chinese newspaperman and poet. He was the Chief Editor of Lat Pau, the first major Chinese newspaper in Singapore.

== Early life ==
Yeh was born on 21 July 1859 in Lantian, Anhui. He later moved to Panyu, Guangzhou. He and his family moved to Hong Kong, where his father went into trading.

== Career ==
At the age of 19, he became an editor at the Hong Kong Chinese and Foreign Gazette. Four years later, he was hired by See Ewe Lay to become the Chief Editor of Lat Pau, the first major Chinese-language newspaper in Singapore. On 2 July 1901, he founded the Singapore Medical Daily, a weekly newspaper published on Tuesdays focusing on traditional Chinese medicine among other topics. It was the first weekly newspaper focusing on traditional Chinese medicine outside of China. It was founded with the intention of promoting good healthcare. In 1906, he introduced a new feature to the newspaper which included the columns "Humorous Notes", which contained social gossip and scientific discoveries, and "Comments", which dealt with current affairs, as well as poems and miscellaneous notes. In 1905 or 1906, he co-founded the Yeung Ching School, a Chinese medium school, with various other businessmen. He was also a founder of the General Chinese Trade Affairs Association, a precursor to the Singapore Chinese Chamber of Commerce and Industry.

He retired from his position as editor of the Lat Pau 25 years after he had joined the paper. However, soon after he had left the paper, See died of a sudden heart attack. See's eldest son, See Tiow Hyong, repeatedly asked Yeh to return to the paper. Yeh eventually relented and returned to the paper. At the time of his death, a had written dozens of poems, many of which were well known for their writing and use of allusions, and was still serving as the chief editor of Lat Pau.

== Personal life and death ==
He could carve seals and play the zither. Prior to 1901, he lived on Tofu Street. In 1901, he moved to 38 Mosque Street. He was on good terms with Zuo Binglong and Huang Zunxian and admired their efforts to establish literary societies. He died on 9 September 1921, at the age of 62.

== Legacy ==
The addition of the feature into Lat Pau resulted in the wide usage of supplements in Chinese newspapers. The readership of Lat Pau began to decline after Yeh's death. Some of his poems were compiled in a book titled "The Remaining Poems of Yongweng" by Tan Yeok Seong.
