= Sago Lane =

Road in Chinatown, Singapore

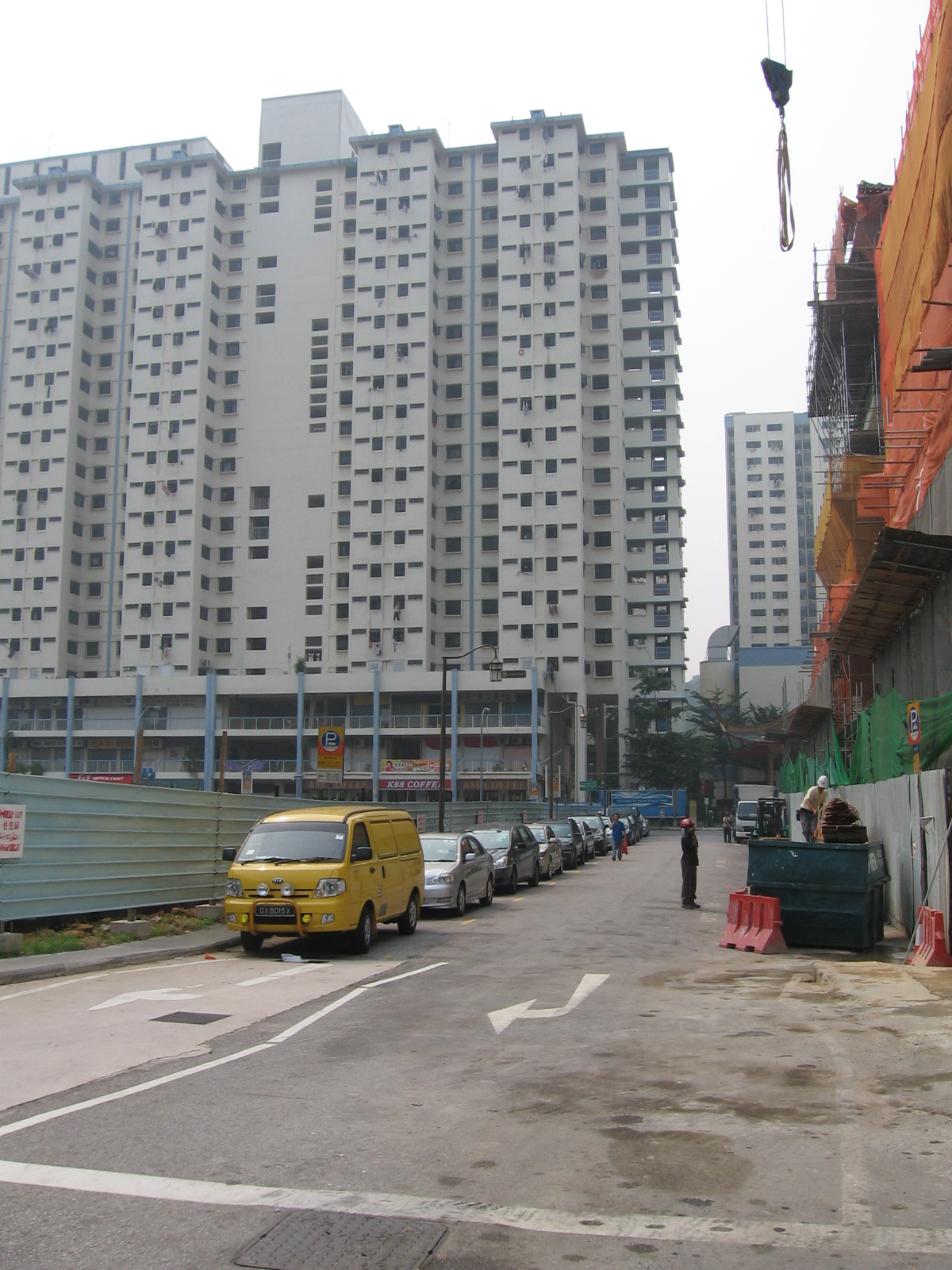
Sago Lane in Chinatown, Singapore.

Sago Lane (simplified Chinese: 硕莪巷; traditional Chinese: 碩莪巷) is a one-way lane in Chinatown within the Outram Planning Area in Singapore. The street links Banda Street to Neil Road. In the past, the street was much longer and was home to funeral parlours or death houses, which gave the street its nickname of sei yan gai or the "street of the dead". Part of the street was demolished in the late 1960s due to the construction of the new HDB development at Kreta Ayer, also known as Chinatown Complex. Currently the street is mainly used during Chinese New Year as part of the festive bazaar in Chinatown.

Sago Lane is known as ho ba ni au koi in Hokkien, which literally means "the street behind Ho Man Nin". Ho Man Nin is the chop of a well known singing hall in neighbouring Sago Street.

== Etymology and history ==
19th century: The lane was named after the sago factories in the area. The sago was then taken from the powdery pith of the trunk of the rumbia palm and processed into flour that was used to make desserts, textile starch and hospital food. After processing, it was mostly re-exported to Europe and India. Sago became a staple export item for Singapore in 1834. In 1849, there were 15 Chinese and 2 European Sago factories in the area. Sago lane and Sago street became a prosperous manufacturing centre. During the 1850s, there were thirty sago factories in the town which had a total output of 8,000 tons annually. Many of the sago factories were in the Sago Street area. Sago lane in particular, was occupied by the Cantonese. Many of these factory workers lived in the area of these factories, and the areas surrounding Sago Lane and Street soon became a hub for many traders, coolies, hawkers, peddlers, shops and brothels.

Early 20th century: As the area developed in the 1920s, most of the sago factories began to disappear in both streets. In the 1920s, the lane was used as a jinriksha station in Chinatown where Japanese and Chinese brothels moved into Sago street. The lane's famous Chinese death houses or funeral homes came into existence in the late 19th century. This was the place where people near death will be left to die, with the funeral parlour prepared below. Sago lane also became a popular station to cater to the popular entertainment zone next door, Ho-man-nin, as it is often named 'Ho man in hau pin kai' or ‘The street behind Ho-man-nin’. Soon after, more and more death houses started up on the street. By 1948, there were 7 death houses, of which only 2 were licensed as ‘sick-receiving houses’ In the 1950s, business for these death houses reached its peak. This was because the early Chinese immigrants that moved into Singapore had all aged.

As people were superstitious and believed that it was inauspicious to die in their own home, many chose to pay a small fee to stay in these death houses. Population density in Singapore was also increasing rapidly, causing number of patrons to increase at an exponential rate. The old Singapore under the British ruling offered no proper premise for the dying as well. Thus, Death houses became the next best option for many.

Following the funeral homes, shops that sold coffins and Chinese paraphernalia including incense paper, funeral clothing etcetera, relating to Chinese funerals started to open along the street. However, the street does not only provide death services. There was an open market that lined the streets of Sago lane. As Chinese funerals were extended affairs that took place for many days, the wet market stalls would convert to food stalls in the evening to cater to mourners and visitors of the dead.

Death houses

The common patrons of the houses were the lower classes of the society, often the samsui women. The houses were dark, smelly and creepy. In the death houses, bodies were laid on wooden planks supported by some stools with candles and joss sticks scattered on the floor. It was only the poor or the very superstitious died in this manner. People were very superstitious then. Many had to take out loans to give their relatives a proper burial as it was quite an expensive affair. The rich, on the other hand, mostly died in their own homes, as they were able to pay the extra cost of exorcising the house and cleansing the people from ‘evil spirits’. The crowded shop houses were unhygienic, with poor ventilation, lighting and sanitation, has limited cooking facilities, and little privacy. There was little professional care for the dying, causing disease to be rampant in the house. There was little to no furniture except for the hard beds occupied by the dying. According to Milwaukee Sentinel in 1957, “about 70 persons a month come to each of the houses to die in loneliness”. The death houses never closed their doors, workers took shifts by day and night and kept the business running 24/7.

1960s: The poor conditions of these houses of Sago lane soon attracted international attention. In 1961, the newly elected government quickly stepped in to place a ban on these houses. The death houses began to close down and number of houses dwindled. Existing death houses converted to funeral parlors instead.
