= Mosque Street =

Mosque Street may refer to:

- Mosque Street, Singapore, located in Chinatown
- Mosque Street, Hong Kong, located in Mid-Levels

== See also ==
- Mosque Road, Bangalore, India
