= See Hoot Kee =

See Hoot Kee (1793 - 26 September 1847), alternatively spelled See Hoot Keh, See Hood Kee or Si Hoo Keh, was a prominent leader and pioneer in the Hokkien community in Singapore.

== Biography ==
See was born in Malacca in 1793. His father had migrated from Zhangpu County in Fujian to Malacca in the 19th century. See ran a tin mining business in Malacca, which was very successful.

having made a fortune from his tin mining business, he migrated to Singapore in 1824, and bought seven pieces of land, becoming one of the biggest land owners in Singapore at the time. He assumed the role of principal donor among the Hokkien community in 1828, and established Heng San Teng Temple to manage a public cemetery.[1][3] He was elected the chief director of the temple, a role which he held for twelve years.[3] He was also a director of the Thian Hock Keng Temple.[1]

See retired at the age of 46 and moved back to Malacca. After returning to Malacca, became the head of the Cheng Hoon Teng Temple, a role which he held for eight years.

== Personal life ==
See had six sons and eleven daughters. He died on 26 September 1847. One of his sons, See Eng Wat, became a prominent merchant. His grandsons included See Ewe Lay, the founder of Lat Pau, the first major Chinese newspaper in Singapore, and See Ewe Boon, a comprador of the Hong Kong and Shangai Bank in Singapore. One of his great-grandsons, See Tiong Wah, was a Justice of the Peace, chairman of the Municipal Council and comprador of the Hong Kong and Shangai Bank.
