= Chinatown, Singapore =

Neighborhood in Singapore, subzone of Outram

Coordinates: 1°17′01″N 103°50′39″E

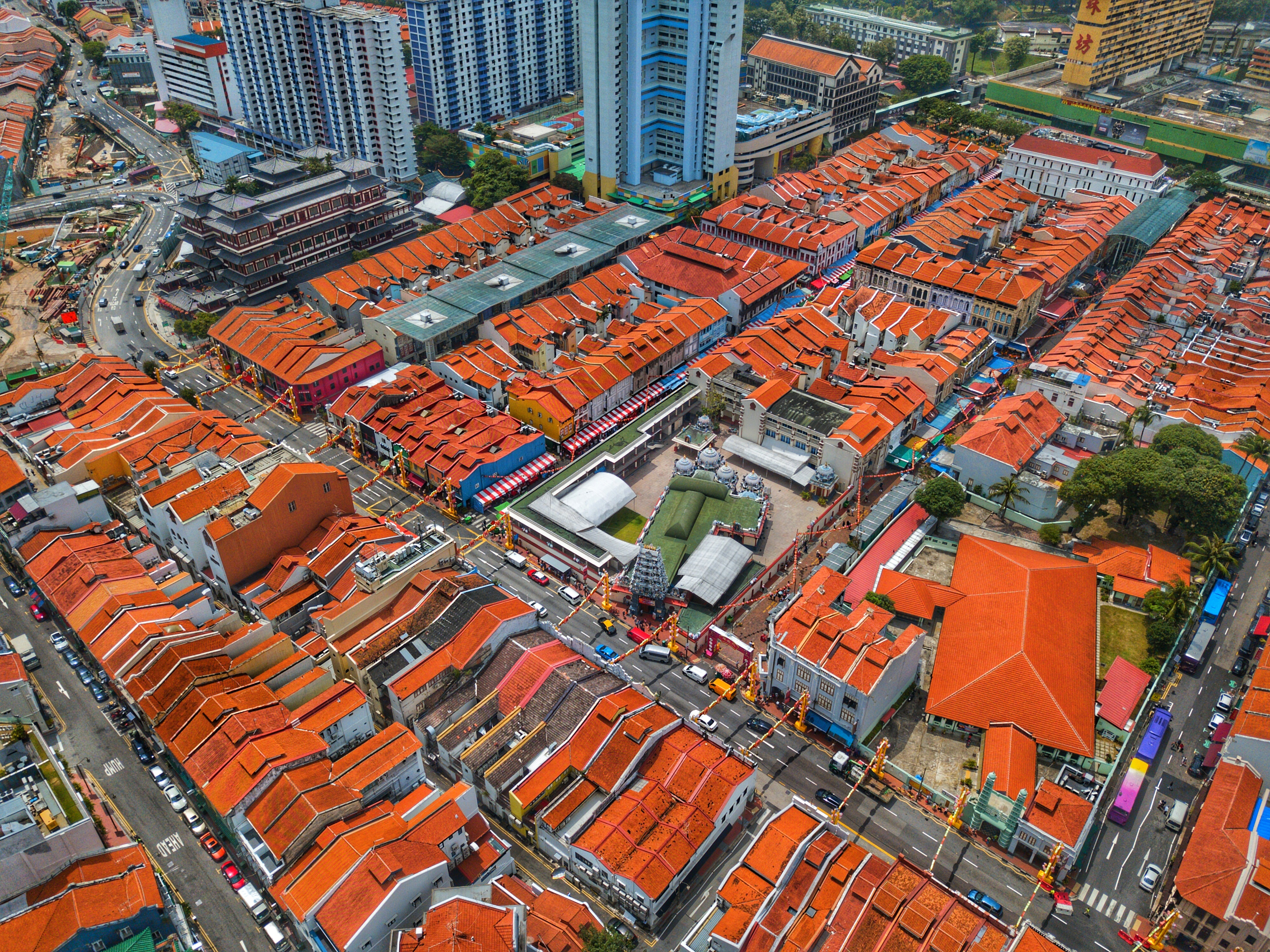

Chinese name
- Traditional Chinese: 牛車水
- Simplified Chinese: 牛车水
- Literal meaning: "ox-cart water"
Transcriptions
Standard Mandarin
- Hanyu Pinyin: Niúchēshuǐ
Hakka
- Romanization: Ngiù-Chhâ-Súi
Yue: Cantonese
- Yale Romanization: Ngàuh chē séui
- Jyutping: Ngau4 Ce1 Seoi2
Southern Min
- Hokkien POJ: Gû-chhia-chúi

Malay name
- Malay: Kreta Ayer

Tamil name
- Tamil: சைனா டவுன்

Chinatown (Note: (simplified Chinese: 牛车水; traditional Chinese: 牛車水; Pe̍h-ōe-jī: Gû-chhia-chúi, Yale: Ngàuhchēséui, Malay: Kreta Ayer, Tamil: சைனா டவுன்)) is a subzone and ethnic enclave located within the Outram district in the Central Area of Singapore.

This area encompasses five precincts in Singapore: Kreta Ayer, Ann Siang/Club Street, Telok Ayer, Tanjong Pagar/Duxton and Bukit Pasoh. Featuring distinctly Chinese cultural elements, Chinatown has had a historically concentrated ethnic Chinese population.

Chinatown is one of Singapore's most historically and culturally significant districts. Established under the Raffles Town Plan (also known as the Jackson Plan), the area southwest of Singapore River became home to Chinese migrants, a place of commerce, clan associations, and cultural institutions for Chinese migrants in Singapore, eventually growing into the area we now know as Chinatown. As time went on and Singapore developed into the city-state it is now, Chinatown grew from a racial enclave into a vibrant hub, best known for its shophouse-lined streets, traditional markets, and religious landmarks, including Thian Hock Keng Temple and Sri Mariamman Temple.

In recent times, Chinatown has undergone significant changes due to urban redevelopment, heritage branding, and gentrification. While state-led conservation policies have ensured the preservation of much of its historical architecture, the district has seen rising property values, demographic shifts, and a general shift toward tourism-based economic activities. Today, Chinatown functions as both a heritage attraction and a commercial hub, raising debates over how to balance cultural preservation with modernisation.

== Etymology ==
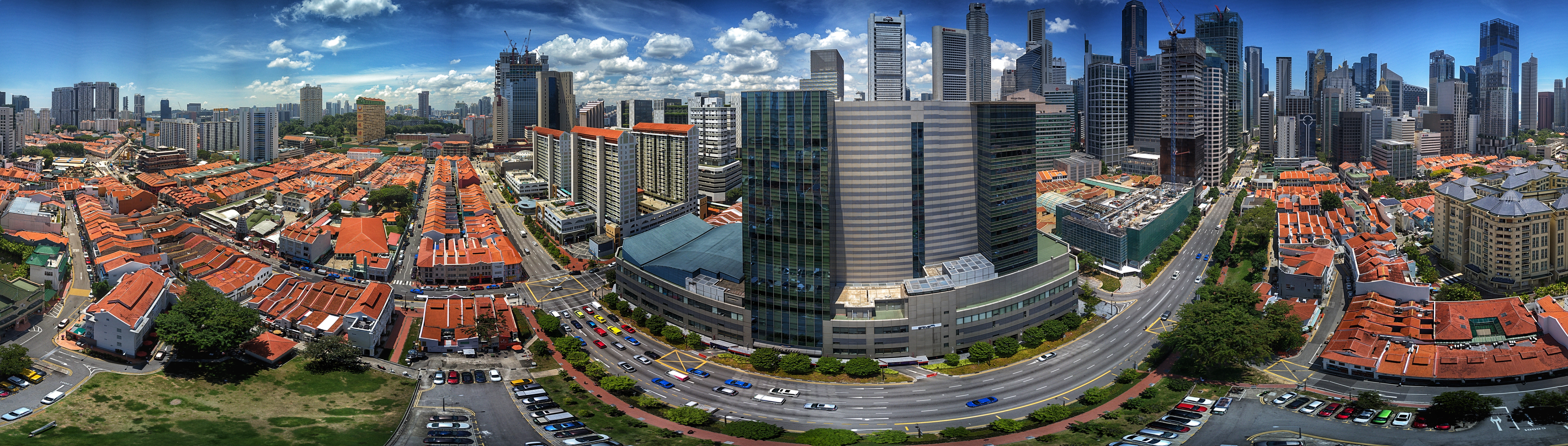
Aerial perspective of Chinatown. Taken from Club Street. October 2018

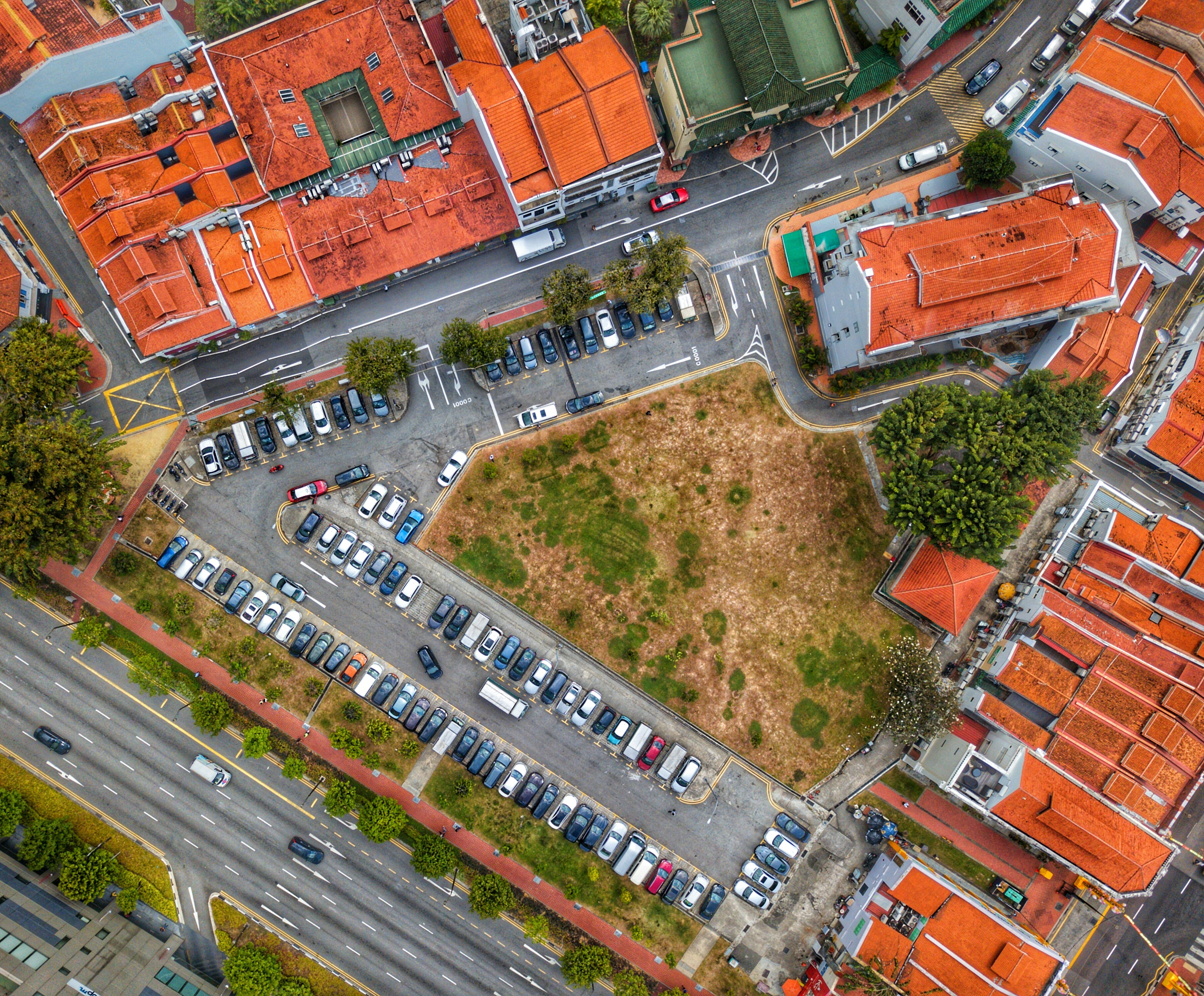
Topdown look of a carpark near Club Street

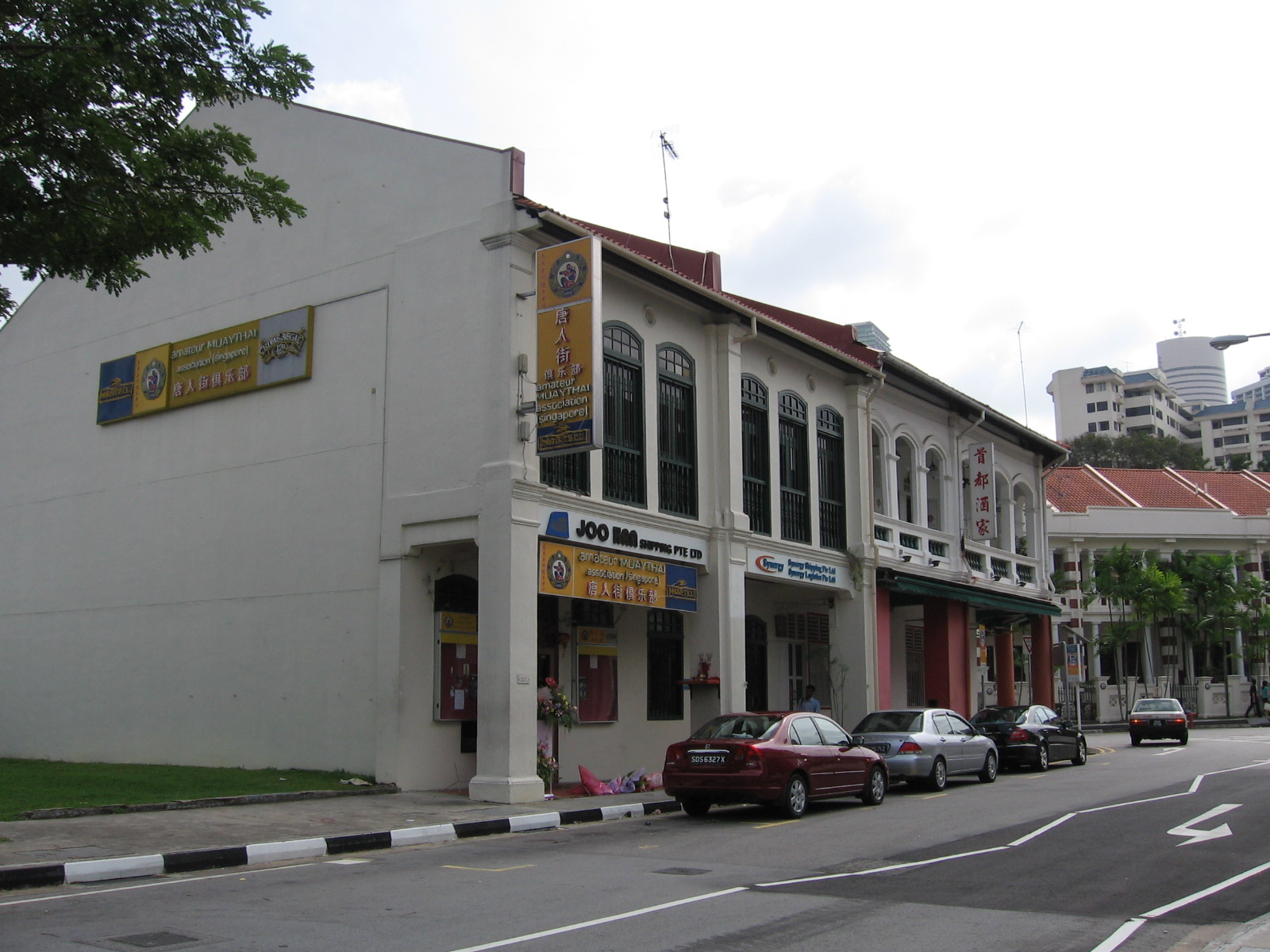
Bukit Pasoh Road is located on a hill that in the 1830s marked the western boundary of the colonial town

Singapore's Chinatown is known as Niu che shui (Note: (simplified Chinese: 牛车水; traditional Chinese: 牛車水; pinyin: Niúchēshuǐ; lit. 'ox car water')) in Mandarin, Gû-chhia-chúi in Hokkien, and Ngàuh-chē-séui in Cantonese – all of which mean "bullock water-cart" – and Kreta Ayer in Malay, (Note: (Post-1972 spelling: kereta air)) which means "water cart". This is due to the fact that Chinatown's water supply was principally transported by animal-driven carts in the 19th century. Although these names are sometimes used for referring to Chinatown in general, they actually refer to the area of Kreta Ayer Road.

== Geography ==
Chinatown consists of five distinctive sub-areas which were developed at different times.

- Telok Ayer – developed in the 1820s
- Kreta Ayer – developed in the 1830s
- Ann Siang/Club Street – developed in the 1890s
- Bukit Pasoh – developed in early 1900s
- Tanjong Pagar – developed in the 1920s

Chinatown Complex is located along Smith Street, which was known colloquially as hei yuan kai (theatre street) in Cantonese because of its famous Cantonese opera theatre Lai Chun Yuen, which opened in 1887 to cater to the Cantonese community there, drawing large crowds during the 1910s and 1920s (Nasir, 2005).

== History ==
=== Early settlement and development (1819–1942) ===
==== Origins and colonial planning ====
The origins of Chinatown can be traced back to 1819, when Sir Stamford Raffles first established a British threshold on Singapore's grounds. Under the Raffles Town Plan of 1822, areas in Singapore became designated for different ethnic groups, with the Chinese allocated to land southwest of the Singapore River. This district was widely referred to as Chinese Campung (Chinese Settlement), and became a centre of Chinese migration, trade and communal activities.

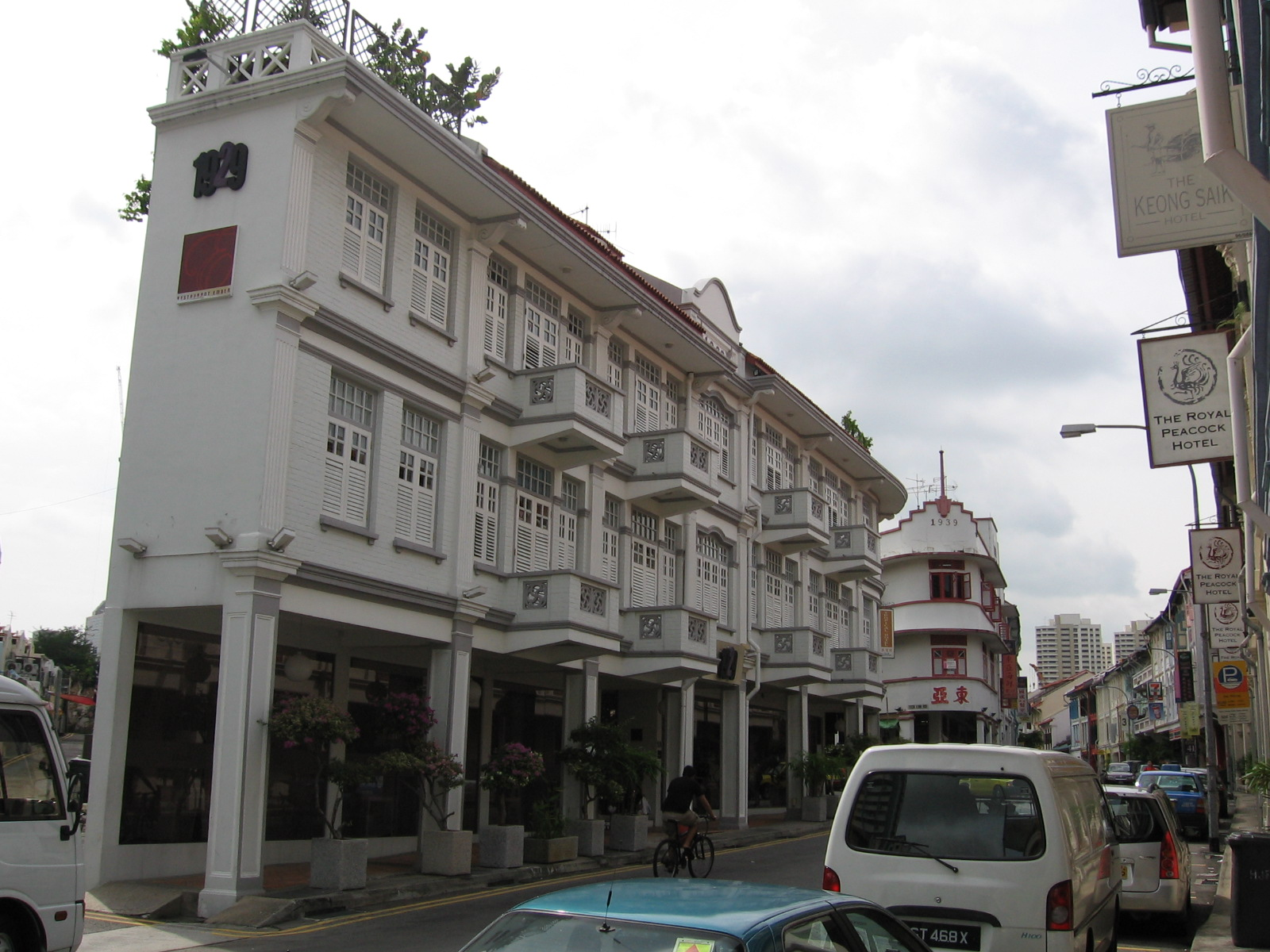
Keong Saik Road was once a red light area in Chinatown in the 1960s, but has since been transformed into a street with many boutique hotels.

In the aforementioned Raffles Plan of Singapore, Chinatown originally was a division of colonial Singapore where Chinese immigrants tended to reside. Although as Singapore grew, Chinese immigrants settled in other areas of the island-city, Chinatown became overcrowded within decades of Singapore's founding in 1819 and remained such until many residents were relocated at the initiation of Singapore's governmental Housing Development Board in the 1960s.

In 1822, Sir Stamford Raffles wrote to Captain C. E. Davis, President of the Town Committee, and George Bonham and Alex L. Johnson, Esquires, and members, charging them with the task of "suggesting and carrying into effect such arrangements on this head, as may on the whole be most conducive to the comfort and security of the different classes of inhabitants and the general interests and welfare of the place..."

He went on to issue instructions, as a guide to the committee, which included a general description of Singapore Town, the ground reserved by the government, the European town and principal mercantile establishments and the native divisions and "kampungs". These included areas for Bugis, Arabs, Indians, Malays, and Chinese kampungs. Raffles was very clear in his instructions and his guidelines were to determine the urban structure of all subsequent development. The "five-foot way", for example, the continuous covered passage on either side of the street, was one of the public requirements.

Raffles foresaw the fact that "it may be presumed that they (the Chinese) will always form by far the largest portion of the community". For this reason, he appropriated all of the land southwest of the Singapore River for their accommodation but, at the same time, insisted that the different classes and the different provinces be concentrated in their separate quarters and that these quarters, in the event of fire, be constructed of masonry with tiled roofs.

This thus resulted in the formation of a distinct section titled Chinatown. However, only when parcels of land were leased or granted to the public in and after 1843 for the building of houses and shophouses, did Chinatown's physical development truly begin. In the 19th and early 20th centuries, Chinatown only grew as more Chinese immigrants arrived in Singapore seeking economic opportunities. Majority of these Chinese immigrants worked as labourers, merchants, and craftsmen, contributing to Chinatown's rapid development.

==== Formation of clan associations and trade networks ====
As a direct result of the large influx of Chinese migrants into Singapore, clan associations (Huiguan, 会馆) were created to provide social support, employment assistance and financial aid to the Chinese migrants. These clans were often distinguished by dialect groups, surnames or trade and contributed significantly to the Chinese’ community cohesiveness.

Some of the more significant clan associations were:

- Hokkien Huay Kuan (福建会馆) – Representing the Hokkien-speaking community.
- Cantonese Kongsi (广肇会馆) – Providing aid to Cantonese migrants, particularly in trade and craftsmanship.
- Teochew Poit Ip Huay Kuan (潮州八邑会馆) – Supporting Teochew traders and artisans.

Chinatown then became known for its bustling commercial streets, featuring traditional Chinese trades like goldsmithing, calligraphy, and herbal medicine. Markets and hawker stalls also played a crucial role in the local economy, through their sales of goods such as textiles, spices, and food.

==== Living conditions and social issues ====
In the late 19th century, Chinatown had developed into a densely populated area with narrow streets and overcrowded dwellings. Moreover, it had suffered from poor sanitation and a lack of proper infrastructure, leading to frequent disease outbreaks as well as poverty and crime.

Not only that, but secret societies were also very much active in Chinatown, controlling the district with their underground activities like gambling, the dealing of opium and protection rackets. The British colonial authorities attempted to curb this through legal regulations and police crackdowns but ultimately failed to do so and secret societies remained influential until the early 20th century.

=== Japanese occupation and post-war reconstruction (1942–1959) ===
During World War II, Chinatown was considerably impacted by the Japanese Occupation of Singapore. Following the Japanese invasion of Singapore in 1942, the Japanese military oversaw the Sook Ching massacre – which targeted thousands of Chinese male civilians who were suspected of supporting anti-Japanese resistance movements. These men were detained and executed, many of whom were taken from Chinatown.

The war also caused a severe economic downturn, leading to food shortages and inflation in Singapore. Many businesses struggled, and rebuilding efforts after the war was slow due to the damaged infrastructure and declining trade.

=== Urban redevelopment and conservation (1960s–2000s) ===
==== Post-Independence changes (1960s–1980s) ====
The shophouses were home to "death houses" until 1961, when death houses were banned, and brothels until 1930, when the Women and Girl's Protection Ordinance was enacted, bringing the prostitution situation under control. To cater to those who visited brothels, or participated in extended affairs of Chinese funerals or came to frequent the opera theatre, street hawkers, food stalls and traders selling household goods occupied the streets. In order to address overcrowding and poor living conditions in the city, all street hawkers were relocated into the newly built Kreta Ayer Complex in 1983, which is today's Chinatown Complex.

Following Singapore's independence in 1965, urban redevelopment policies caused a huge change in Chinatown. The government, through the Housing and Development Board (HDB) and the Urban Redevelopment Authority (URA), introduced measures to modernise the city and improve general living conditions for Singaporeans.

These efforts included:

- The development of public housing estates in areas like Toa Payoh, Ang Mo Kio and Bedok, resulting in the relocation of many Chinatown residents.
- Older shophouses and residential dwellings in Chinatown were demolished or repurposed for commercial use.
- The transition of Chinatown from a previously mainly residential district to a largely commercial based area.

Then came the 1980s, where concerns over the loss of historical landmarks in Singapore led to increased interest in heritage conservation.

==== Designation as a conservation area (1989) ====
In 1989, the URA designated Chinatown as a Conservation Area, aiming to preserve its historic architecture and culture. Under these guidelines:

- Shophouse restoration projects were introduced to maintain traditional façades and architectural styles.
- Regulations were imposed to prevent uncontrolled modifications of heritage buildings.
- Chinatown's identity was promoted through heritage trails and cultural tourism initiatives.

In the 1990s, the Singapore Tourism Board (STB) announced a $97.5 million redevelopment plan aiming to revitalise Chinatown. This project aimed to promote Chinatown as an “ethnic quarter” and market it as a “culturally vibrant” location, with preserved cultural and heritage sites like shophouses and buildings.

While conservation efforts were largely successful in preserving Chinatown's physical landscape, the primary aim of these projects were mainly to establish Chinatown as a site of culture, enticing more tourism into Singapore.

=== Modern developments and commercialisation (2000s–present) ===
By the 2000s, Chinatown had become a key location known for heritage tourism, attracting both local and international businesses into the area. Several developments contributed to its transformation:

1. Tourism growth
  - The introduction of guided heritage trails and museums, such as by the Chinatown Heritage Centre, increased tourist interest in the area.
  - Annual Chinese New Year celebrations and Mid-Autumn Festival events had also become major attractions.
2. Retail and business expansion
  - Formerly independent businesses were soon replaced by international retail chains, boutique hotels, and upscale dining establishments.
  - Night markets and food streets became more focused on attracting tourists rather than the display and sale of traditional trades.
3. Decline of traditional trades
  - Many historic businesses, such as Chinese medicine halls, calligraphy stores, and family-run kopitiams (coffee shops), struggled to compete with the rising rents and changing consumer habits.
  - Local entrepreneurs have attempted to revitalise traditional industries, but the economic pressures of modernisation continue to challenge small businesses.

== Legacy ==
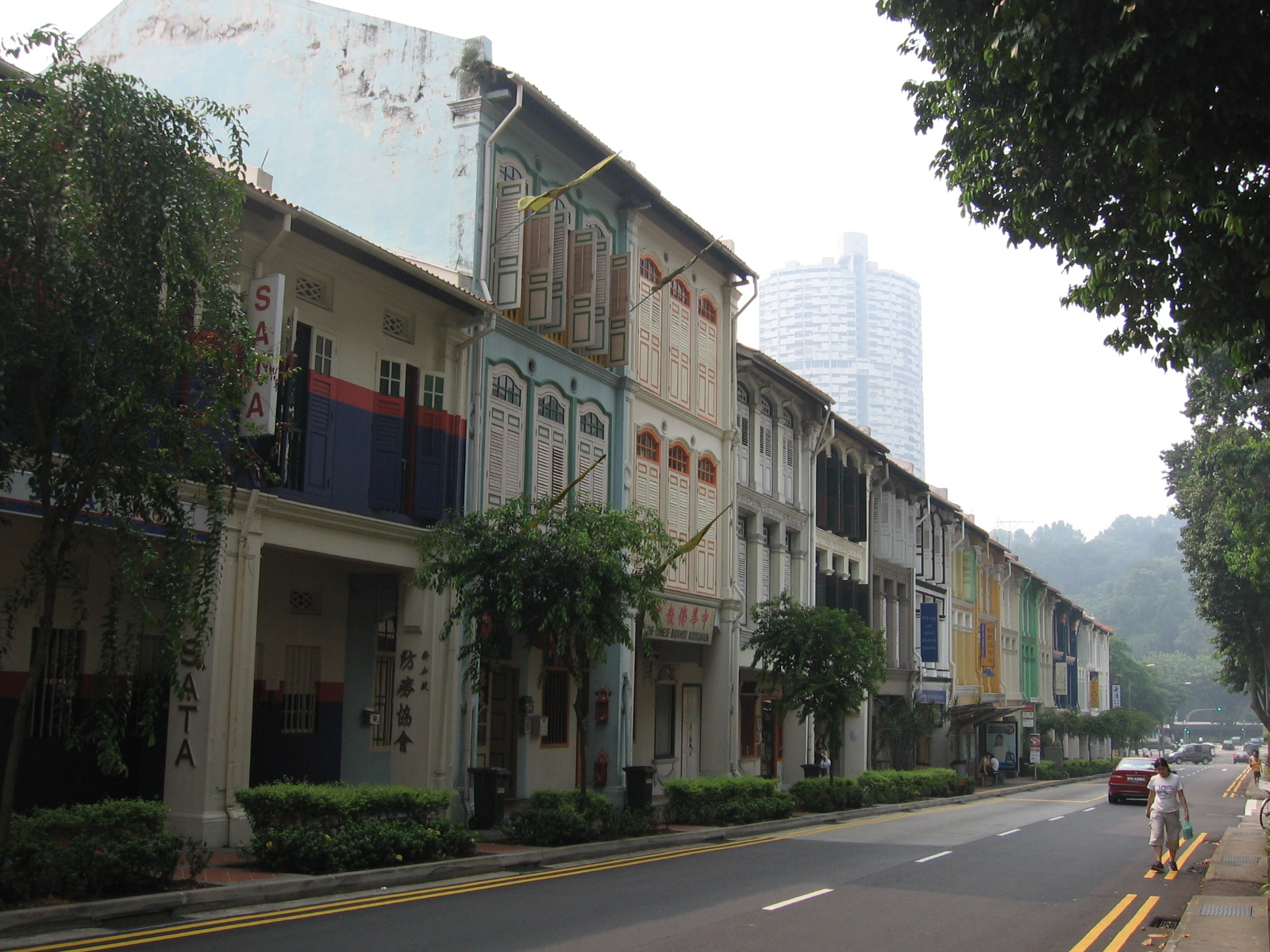
Kreta Ayer Road is the road that defines for Chinese, the Chinatown area. In the 1880s, Kreta Ayer was the red light area in Chinatown.

The legacy of cultural diversity in Chinatown is still present. There used to exist some Hokkien merchants along Havelock Road, Telok Ayer Street, China Street and Chulia Street, and Teochew merchants are mostly in Circular Road, River Valley Road, Boat Quay, and South Bridge Road near Chinatown. The ubiquitous Cantonese are scattered around South Bridge Road, Upper Cross Street, New Bridge Road, and Bukit Pasoh Road as well as others. These days, the former Hokkien and Teochew residents have largely scattered to other parts of the island, leaving the Cantonese as the dominant dialect group in Chinatown.

The Chinese names of Pickering Street are Kian Keng Khau (mouth of the gambling houses) or Ngo Tai Tiahn Hok Kiong Khau (mouth of the five generations of the Tian Hok Temple).

There are also several prominent century-old Chinese temples like Hokkien Thian Hock Keng Temple at Telok Ayer Street, Teochew Wak Hai Cheng Bio Temple at Phillips Street, Siang Cho Keong Temple at Amoy Street, Seng Wong Beo Temple at Peck Seah Street, and Cantonese Cundhi Gong Temple at Keong Siak Roadside.

Guilds, clans, trade unions and associations were all referred to as kongsi are present within Chinatown such as to assist to the needs of each Chinese dialect group, such as Cantonese, Hokkien, etc.

There were the letter writers of Sago Street—in Hokkien this street is called Gu Chia Chwi Hi Hng Cheng (front of Kreta Ayer Theatre), but it was mainly associated with life and death — the sandalwood idols of Club Street and the complicated and simple food of Mosque Street; all rang to the sound of the abacus. Old women could be seen early in the mornings topping and tailing bean sprouts, the skins of frogs being peeled, the newly killed snakes being skinned and the centuries-old panaceas being dispensed by women blessed with the power of healing.

Besides Chinese residents, other races such as the Indians whom migrated during the British Raj live in Chinatown. Within the Chinatown is an important temple for the Tamils, the Sri Mariamman Hindu Tamil Temple, and also mosques, Al-Abrar Mosque at Telok Ayer Street, and Jamae Mosque at Mosque Street. These places of worship catered to the pockets of non-Chinese residents in the area and shows that despite efforts to segregate the early immigrants, they had no qualms living peacefully together, and side by side.

=== Street name origins ===
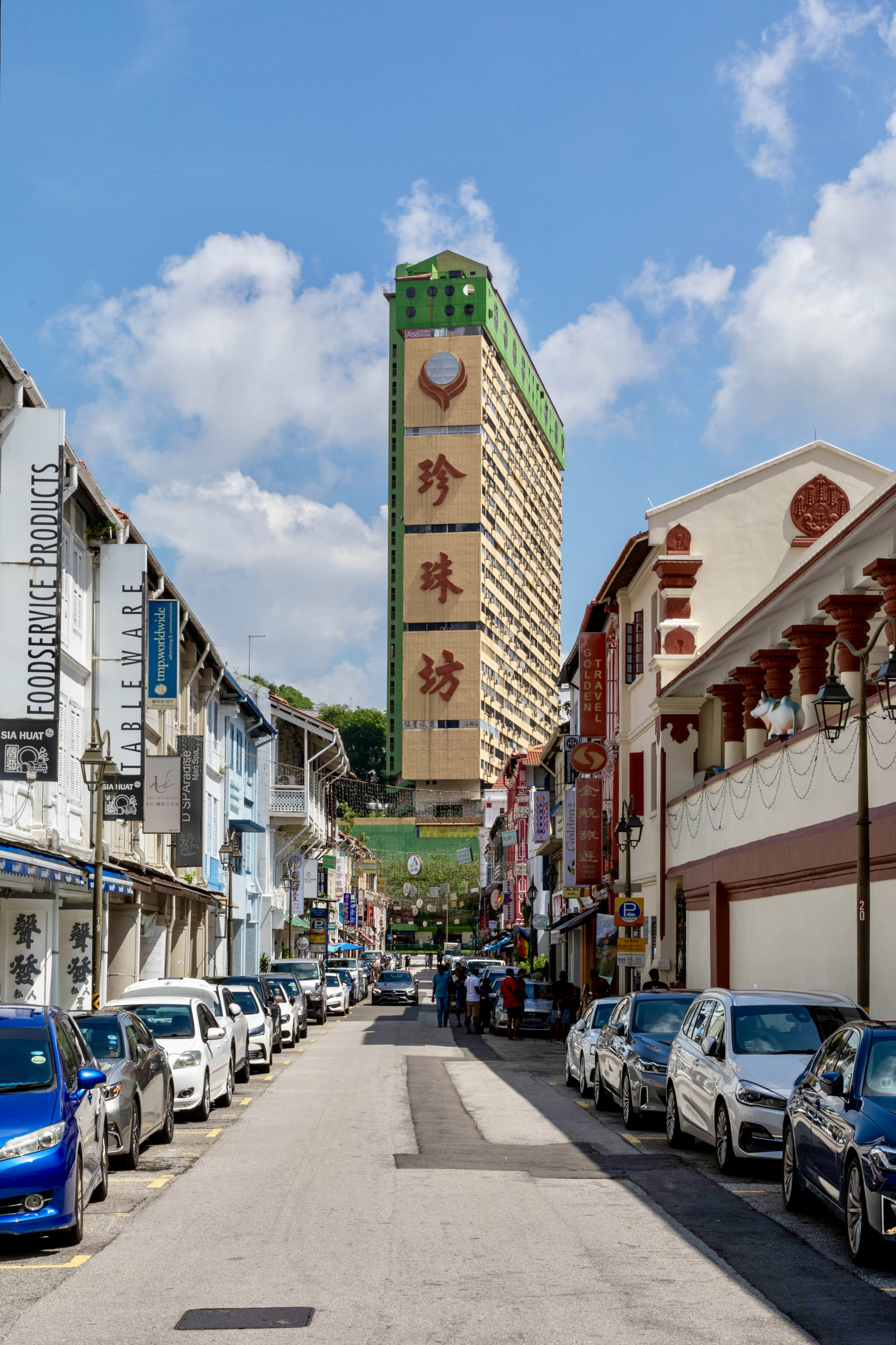
Temple Street from the intersection with South Bridge Road to North West. People's Park Complex at the end of the street.

- Mosque Street is named after Jamae Mosque, located on the South Bridge Road end of the street. The mosque was completed in 1830 by the Chulia Muslims from the Coromandel coast of South India but also used by the Malay Muslims living in the area. In the early years, Mosque Street was the site of ten stables.
- Pagoda Street takes its name from the Sri Mariamman Temple. During the 1850s and 1880s, the street was one of the centres of slave traffic. It also had its share of coolie quarters and opium smoking dens. One of the traders was Kwong Hup Yuen who, it is thought, occupied No. 37, and after whom Pagoda Street is often referred to today.
- Sago Lane and Sago Street got their name because in the 1840s there were a number of sago factories located there. Sago is taken from the pith of the rumbia palm and made into flour that is used for making cakes both sweet and savoury. Funerary businesses were formerly prominent on Sago Lane.
- Smith Street was probably named after Sir Cecil Clementi Smith, who was the Governor of the Straits Settlements between 1887 and 1893.
- Temple Street refers to the Sri Mariamman Temple, which is located at the South Bridge Road end of the street. It was formerly known as Almeida Street after Joaquim d'Almeida, son of José D'Almeida, who owned some land at the junction of Temple Street and Trengganu Street. In 1908, the Municipal Commissioners changed its name to Temple Street to avoid confusion with other streets in Singapore which were also named after D'Almeida.
- Trengganu Street, described as "the Piccadilly of Chinese Singapore" in the past, now forms the heart of the tourist belt in Chinatown. In Chinese, it is called gu chia chui wah koi, or "the cross street of Kreta Ayer". The crossing of streets refers to Smith Street and Sago streets. The street name is derived from Terengganu, a state in present-day Peninsular Malaysia.

== Gentrification and the impact of tourism ==
=== Economic transformation ===
Since the late 20th century, Chinatown has undergone significant economic and structural changes, transitioning from a mainly working-class residential neighbourhood into a commercial and tourism-based district. While urban redevelopment and conservation efforts have attempted to preserve its architectural and cultural heritage, they have also contributed to gentrification, rising property values, and the displacement of traditional businesses and long-time residents.

=== Growth of heritage tourism and cultural rebranding ===
The Singapore government has actively promoted Chinatown as a heritage tourism destination. Some heritage tourism-related initiatives include:

- Chinatown Heritage Trail: A self-guided walking tour launched by the Singapore government, highlighting key historical landmarks and conserved buildings.
- Chinatown Heritage Centre: A museum designed to educate visitors on the lived experiences of early Chinese migrants, including the recreation of the interiors of old shophouse dwellings in Chinatown, such that visitors can truly immerse themselves in how people used to live in Chinatown.
- Themed festivals and night markets: Events such as the Chinese New Year Bazaar and Mid-Autumn Festival celebrations have been expanded to attract both local and international visitors.

While these initiatives have contributed to increased foot traffic and commercial success in Chinatown, they have also been harshly criticised for the emphasis on staged representations of heritage and culture rather than authentic community life.

=== Impact on traditional businesses and cultural identity ===
As Chinatown became increasingly commercialized, many traditional businesses that have made the place their home for many years have chosen to relocate or even close due to the ever-rising property rental costs in Chinatown.

Many of these businesses had been in operation for decades, serving as historical and cultural landmarks in the area. The decline of such businesses has raised concerns over heritage authenticity and the loss of culture in commercialized and modernized Singapore.

=== Demographic and social changes ===
The shift towards commercial and tourism-based development has also forever altered Chinatown's demographics and social landscape, leading to:

- Decline in local residential population
  - Once a vibrant residential district for Chinese migrants and other residents alike, Chinatown today has fewer permanent residents and has largely transformed into a commercial space occupied by businesses.
- Rise of expatriate and foreign-owned businesses
  - New businesses such as luxury boutique stores, Western-style bars, and co-working spaces, have replaced older establishments to better attract international consumers to the area.
  - This shift has added to the perception that Chinatown serves tourists more than the local Chinese-speaking population.
- Change in cultural representation
  - Streets in Chinatown, once known for their traditional markets and street vendors selling their own goods, have been replaced by modern retail brands and global franchises.
  - While cultural festivals and heritage preservation efforts in Chinatown continue to highlight Chinatown's cultural significance in Singapore's history, critics argue that Chinatown's heritage and culture is becoming increasingly erased for a modern commercial establishment that targets tourism.

== Architecture ==
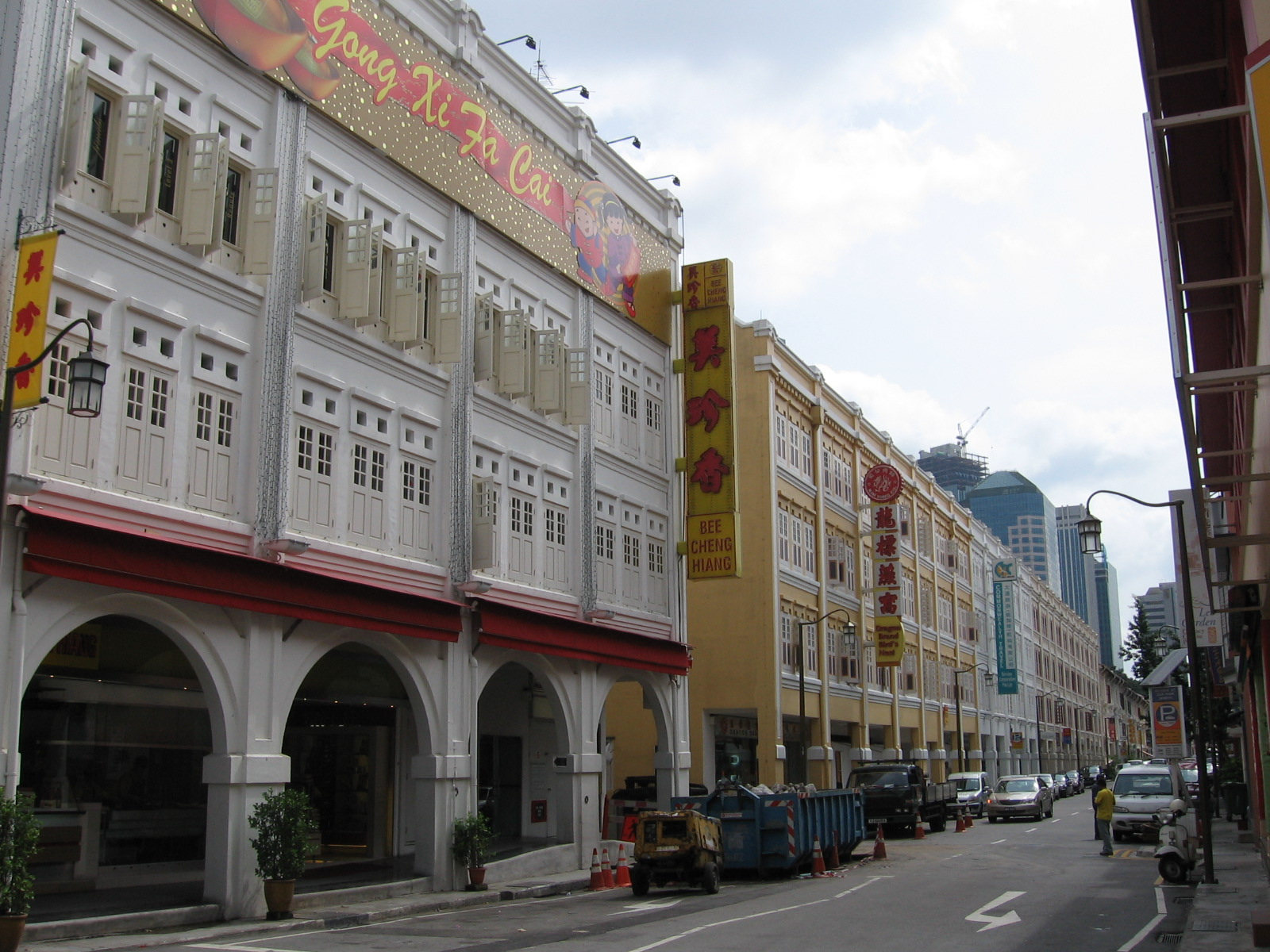
Mosque Street is named after Jamae Mosque, located on the South Bridge Road end of the street.

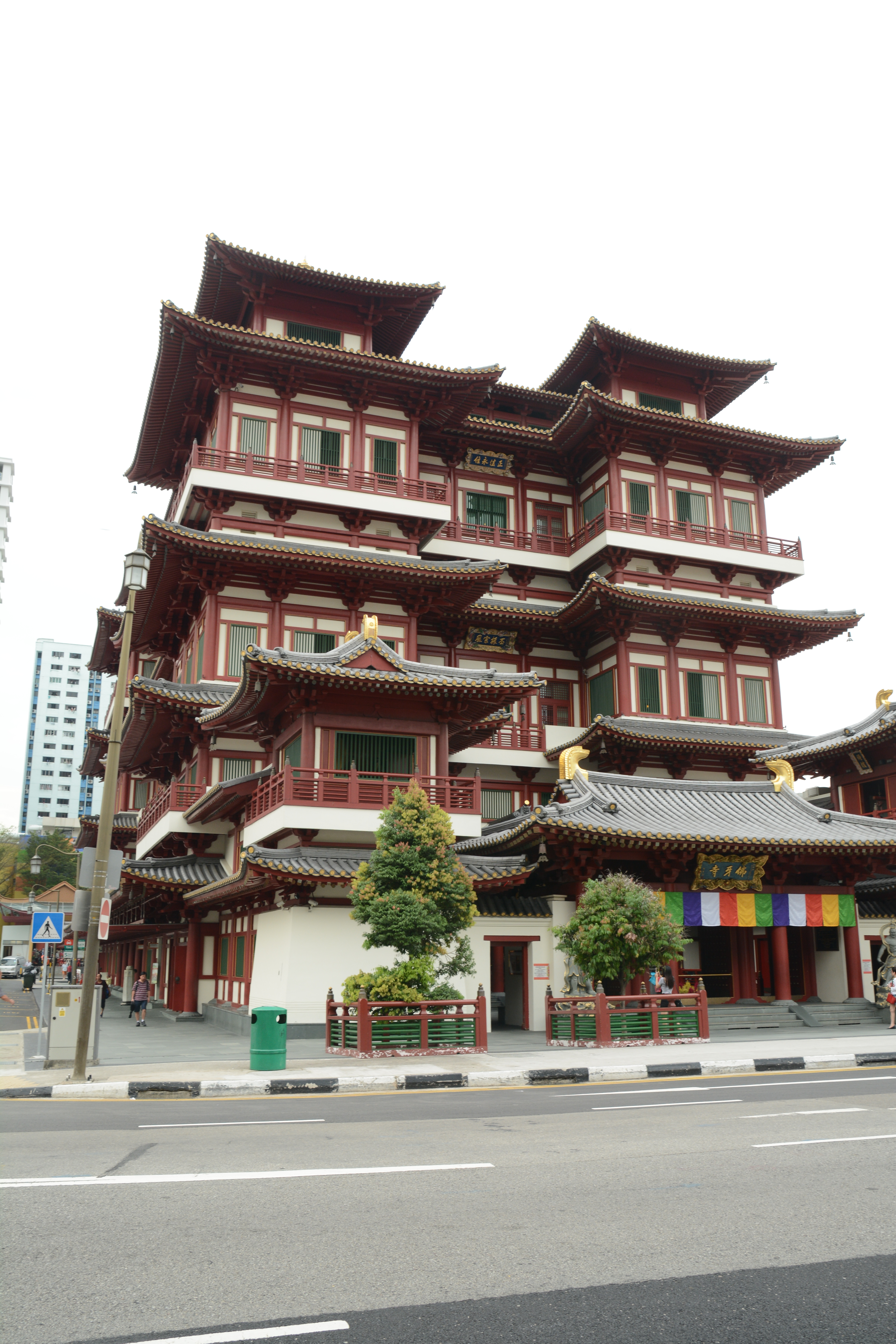
Buddha Tooth Relic Temple

The street architecture of Chinatown's buildings, the shophouses especially, combine different elements of baroque architecture and Victorian architecture and do not have a single classification. Many of them were built in the style of painted ladies, and have been restored in that fashion. These styles result in a variety of different colours of which pastel is most dominant. Trengganu Street, Pagoda Street, and Temple Street are such examples of this architecture, as well as development in Upper Cross Street and the houses in Club Street. Boat Quay was once a slave market along the Singapore River, Boat Quay has the most mixed-style shophouses on the island.

In 1843, when land titles were issued, the terraces in Pagoda Street (now with additions, mostly three-story) were born. They were originally back to back, an arrangement which made night soil collection difficult, but lanes were developed in between following the Singapore Improvement Trust (SIT) back lane orders of 1935.

The architectural character of many of the terraces in Chinatown is much more Italianate in style than those of, for instance Emerald Hill or Petain Road. Windows often appear as mere slits with narrow timber jalousies (often with adjustable slats). Fanlights over the windows are usually quite decorative and the pilasters and balconies and even the plasterwork and colours seem to be Mediterranean in flavour. The style was probably introduced by those early Chinese immigrants (both China-born and Straits-born) who had knowledge of the Portuguese architecture of Macau, Malacca, and Goa, while the Indians would also have been familiar with the European architecture there, although it is difficult to imagine how these people would have had a particularly strong influence on building in Chinatown.

== Transportation ==
The Mass Rapid Transit MRT serves the area at Chinatown MRT station on the North East and Downtown lines, in the middle of pedestrian-only Pagoda Street, and serves the vicinity, as well as several public bus routes which integrates it into Singapore's transportation system. Nearby are the Clarke Quay MRT station, Maxwell MRT station, Outram Park MRT station, and Telok Ayer MRT station, as well as a bus terminal called Kampong Bahru Bus Terminal.

== Notable places ==
- Tong Ah Building
- 321 New Bridge Road

== Politics ==
Chinatown is divided between two Group Representation Constituencies (GRCs), Tanjong Pagar and Jalan Besar, in terms of representation in Parliament. Singapore's first Prime Minister, Lee Kuan Yew, was a Member of Parliament representing Tanjong Pagar GRC before his death in March 2015.

After the September 2015 general election, Indranee Rajah represented that part of Tanjong Pagar GRC before being replaced by Foo Cexiang in 2025. The Chinatown area that is part of Jalan Besar GRC is represented by Josephine Teo since 2020, following the retirement of Lily Neo after serving 23 years of politics from 1997.

== Gallery ==
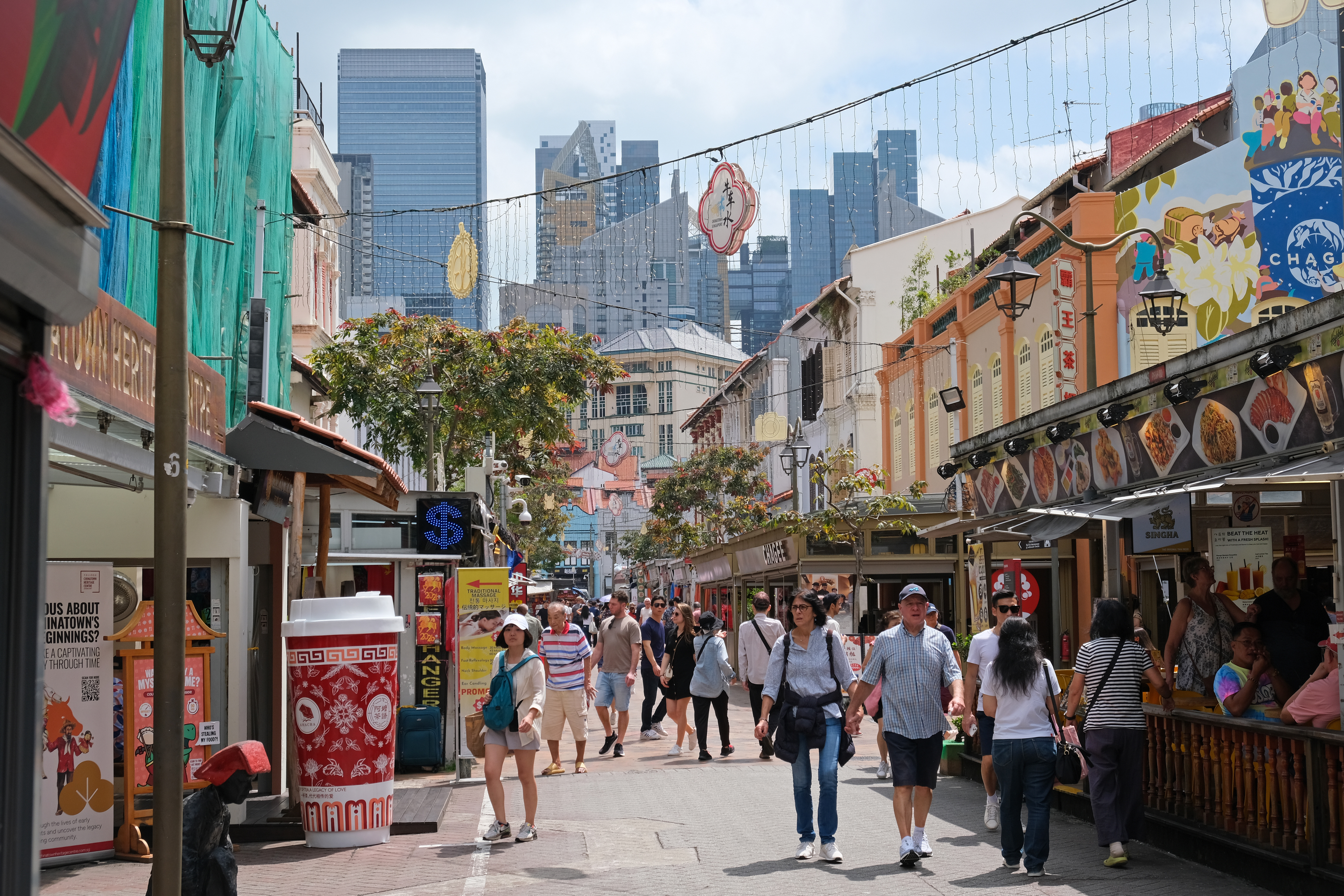
Pagoda Street is named after the Hindu temple, Sri Mariamman Temple, located on the South Bridge Road end of the street.

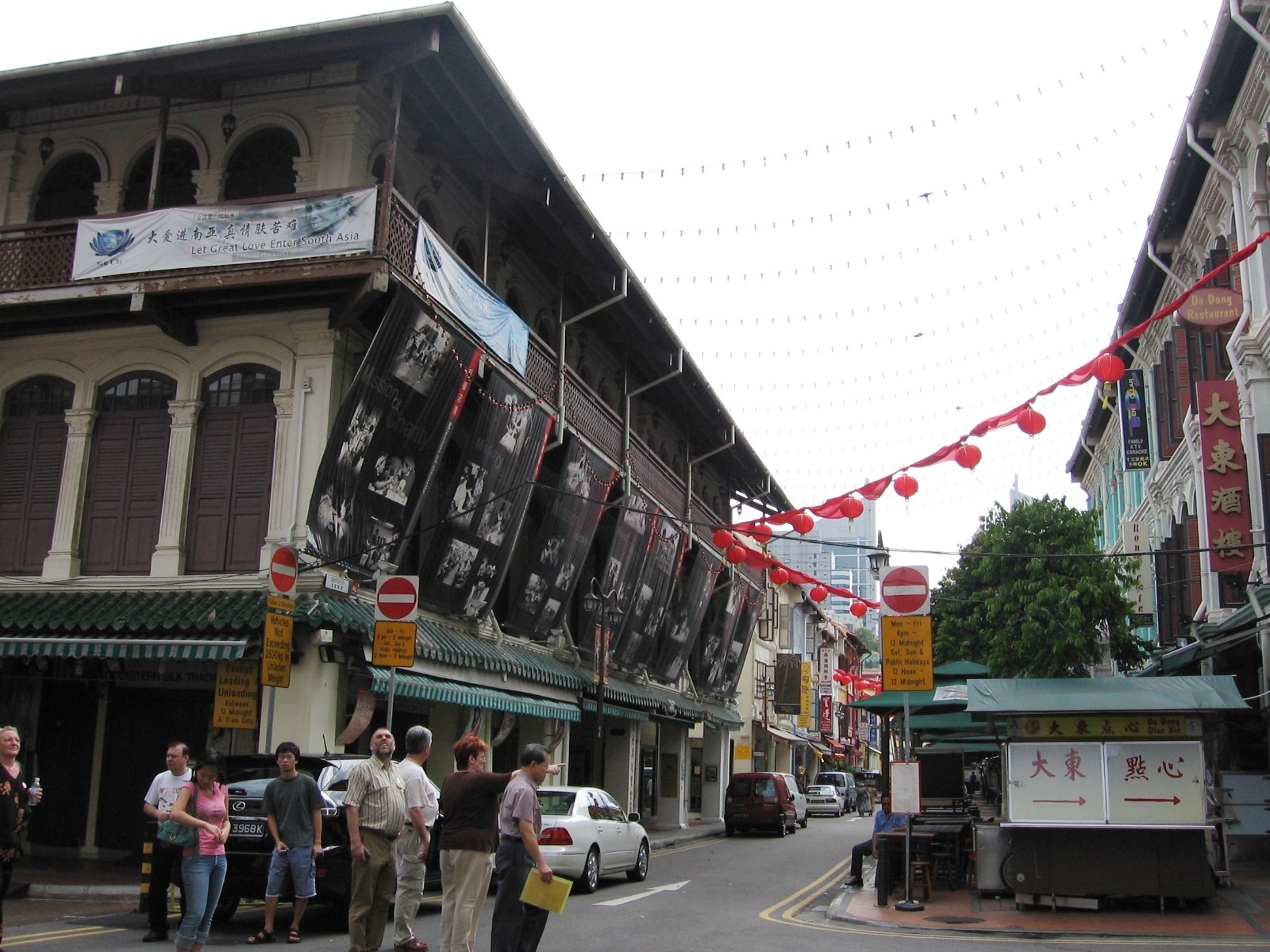
Smith Street now has an open air food street.

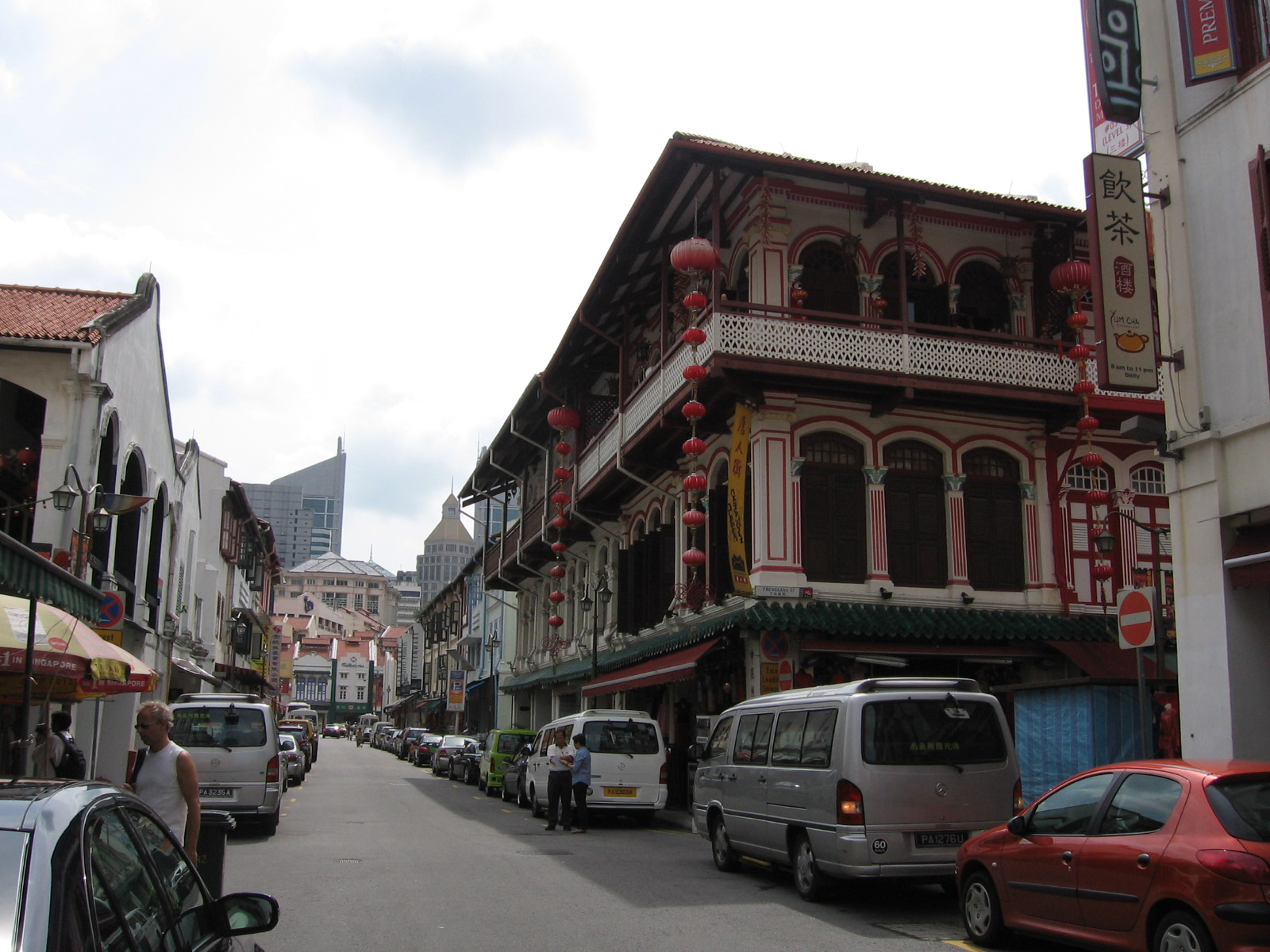
Temple Street refers to the Sri Mariamman Temple, which is located at the South Bridge Road end of the street.

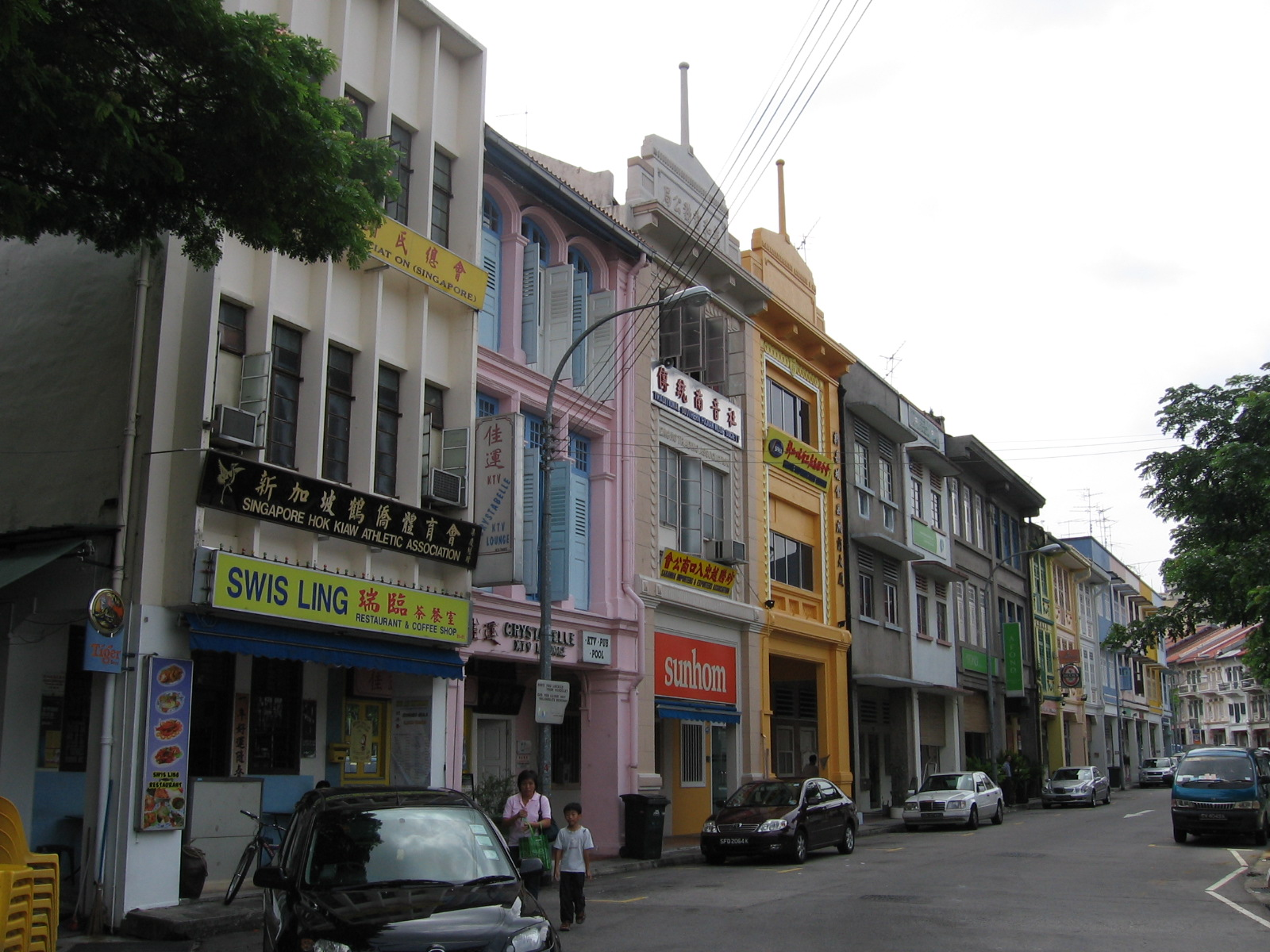
Three-storey shophouses along Teo Hong Road.

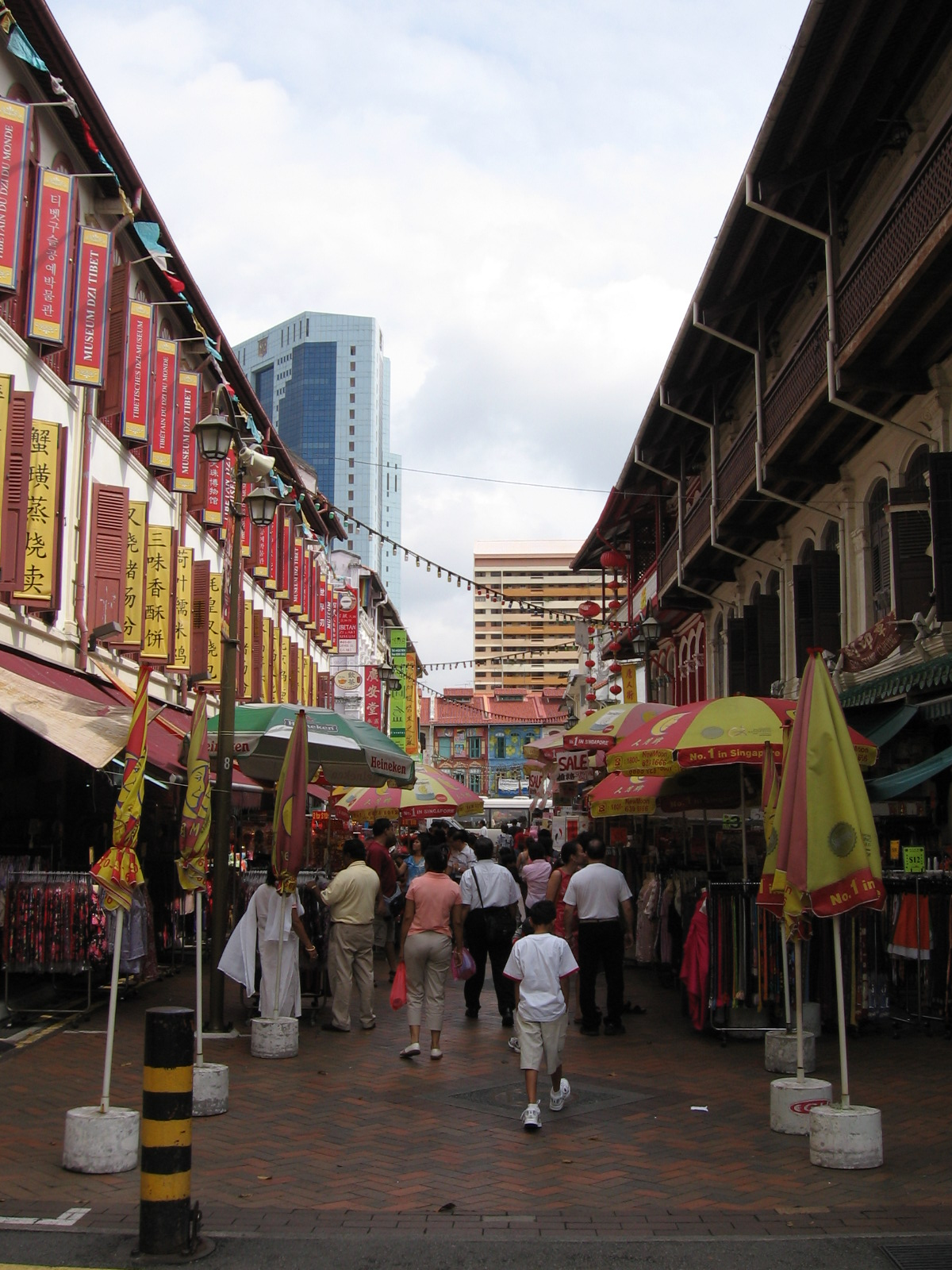
Trengganu Street has been converted to a pedestrian mall with shops lining both sides of the street, which transforms into a night market after dark.

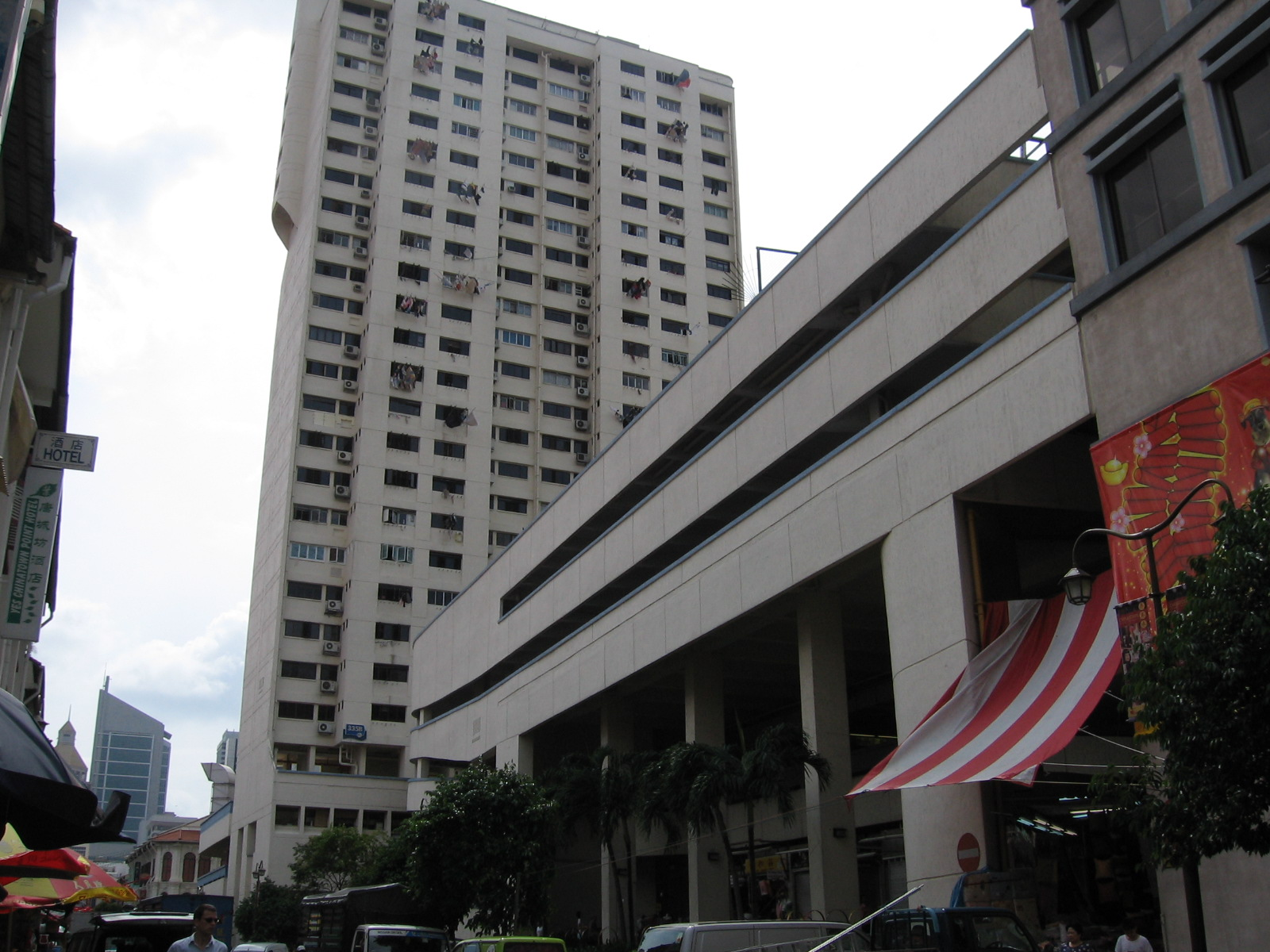
Chinatown Complex at Smith Street houses a food centre, a wet market and shops selling sundry goods.

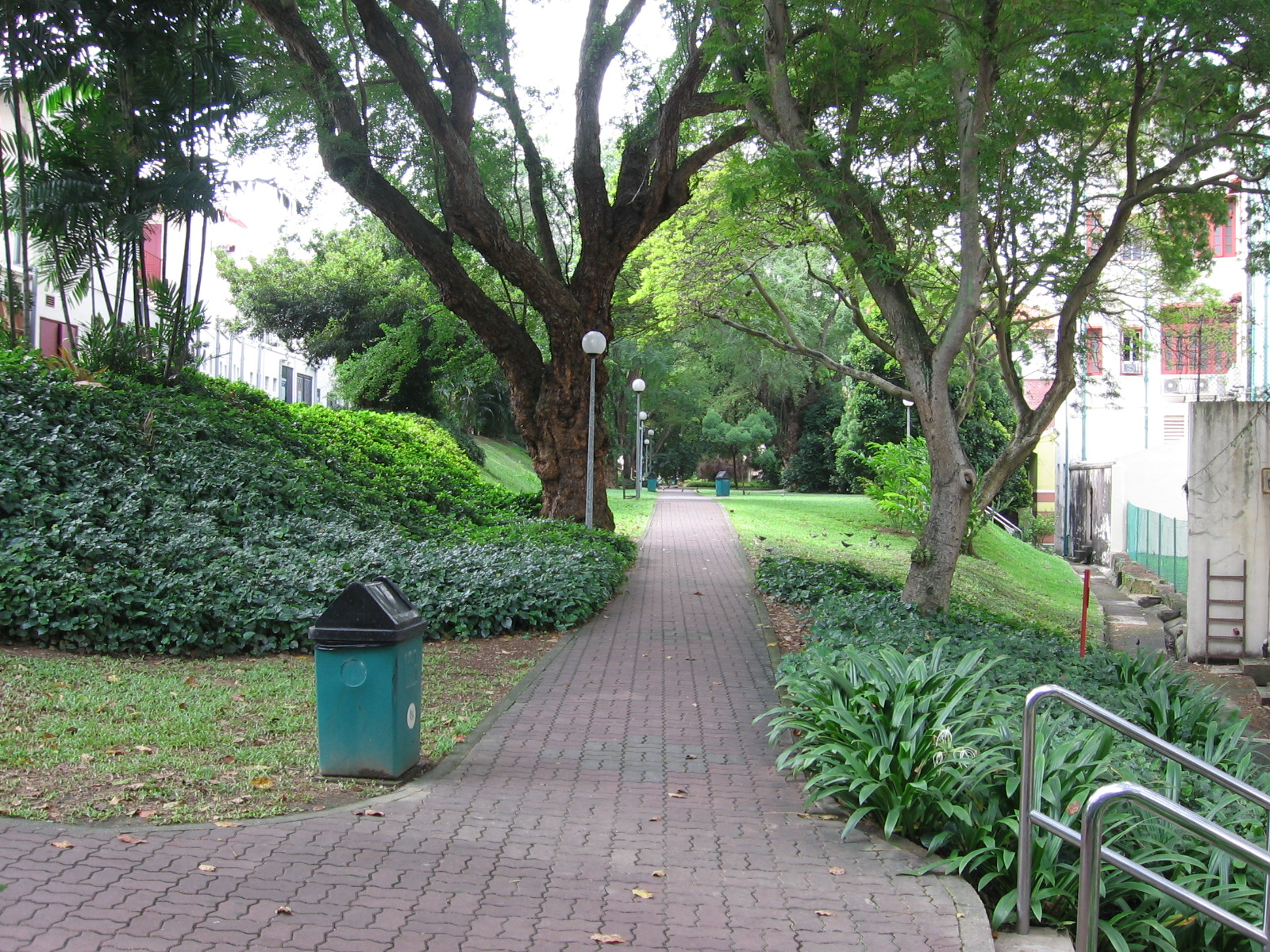
Duxton Plain Park extends from New Bridge Road in Chinatown to the former Yan Kit Swimming Complex in Tanjong Pagar.

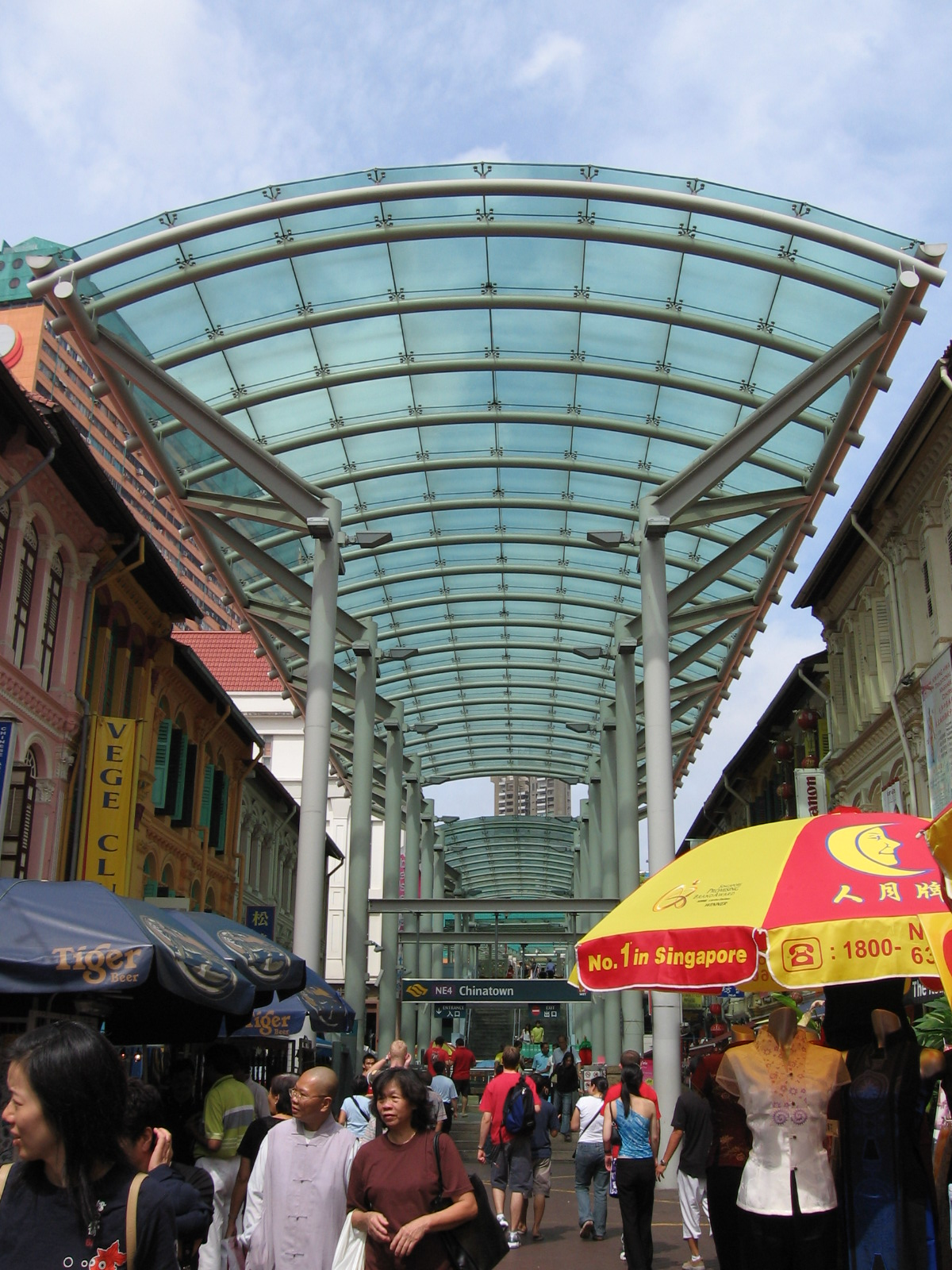
Entrance to Chinatown MRT Station at Pagoda Street.

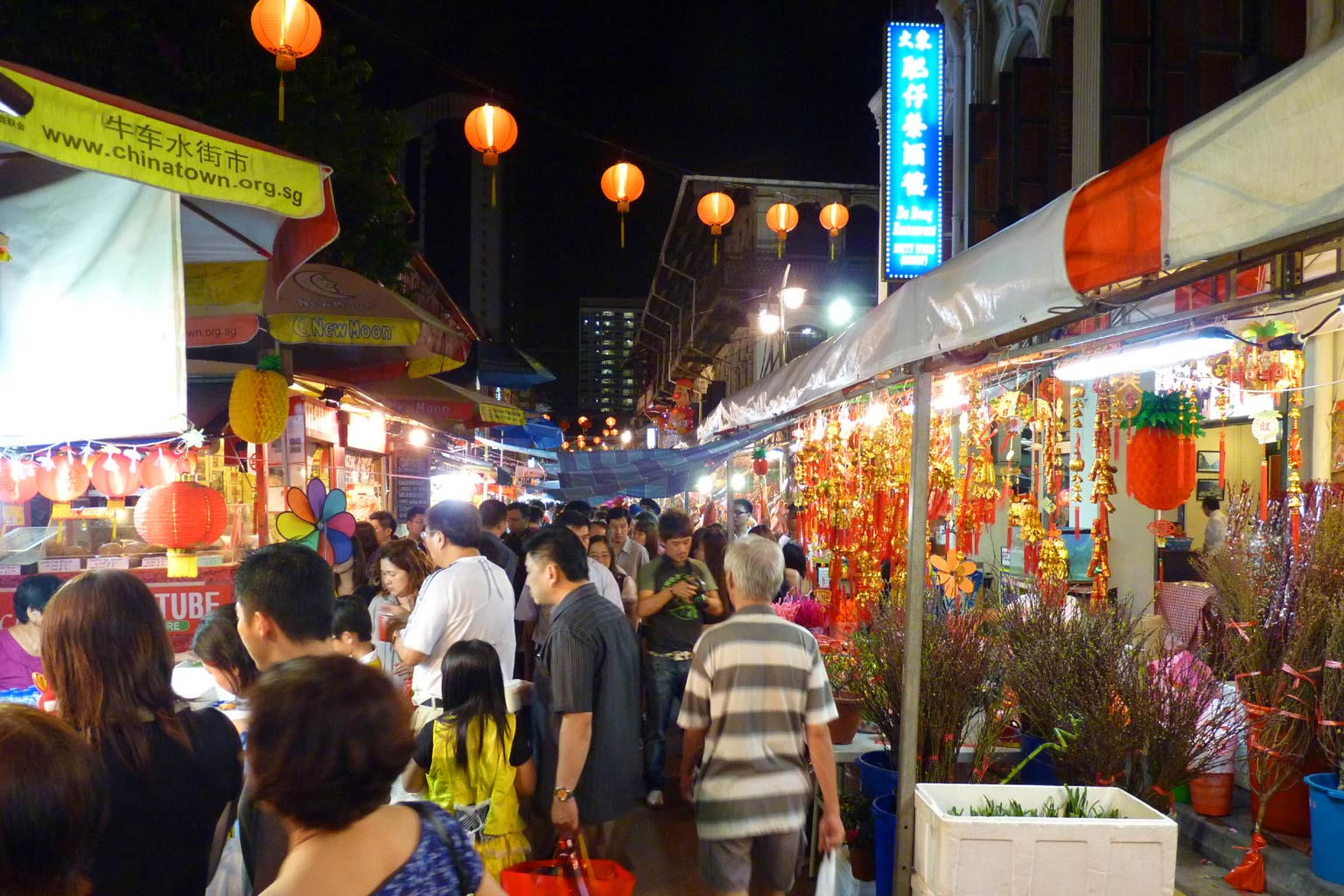
Night market at Singapore Chinatown around Chinese New Year 2011.

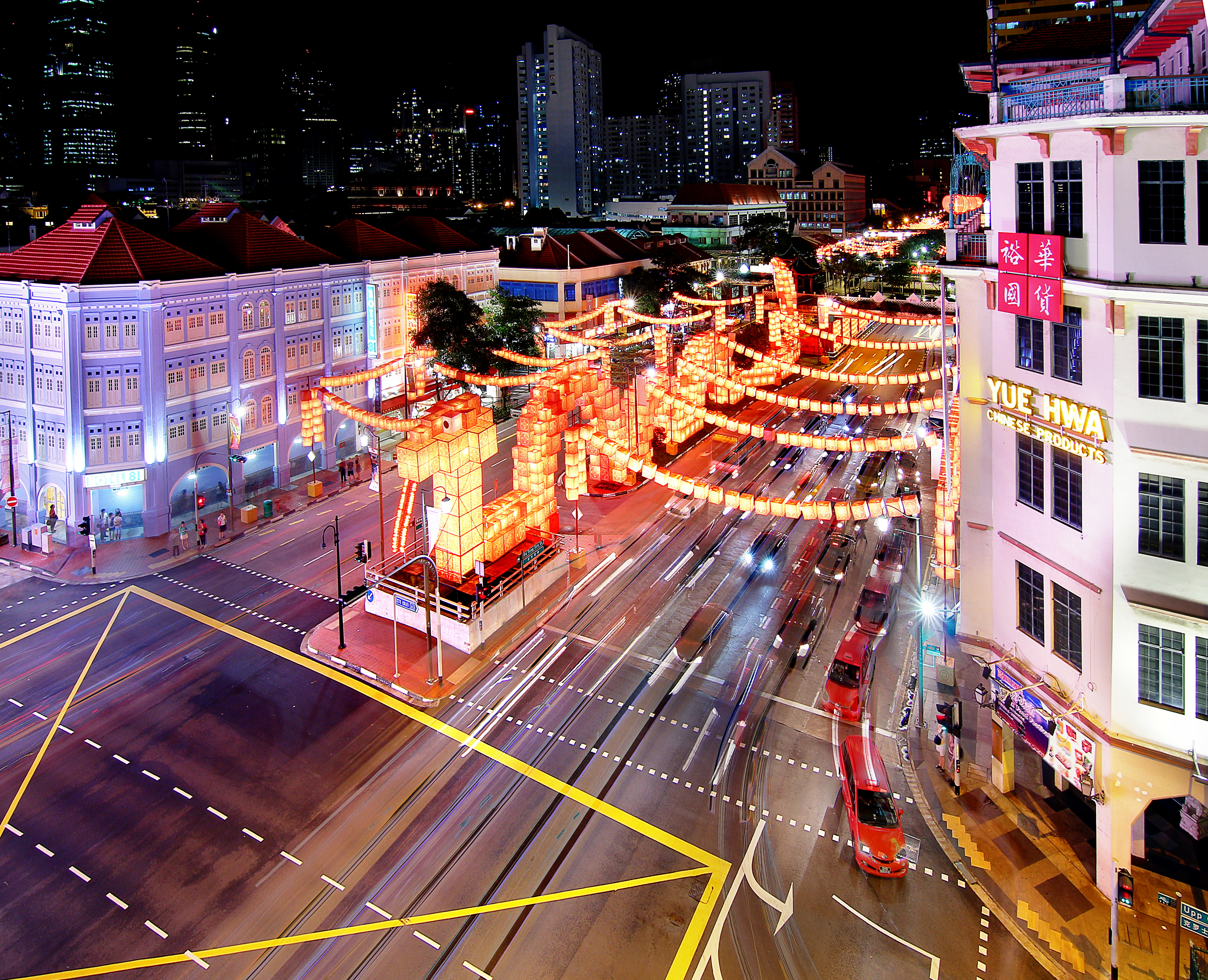
The year of the Snake New Year 2013.

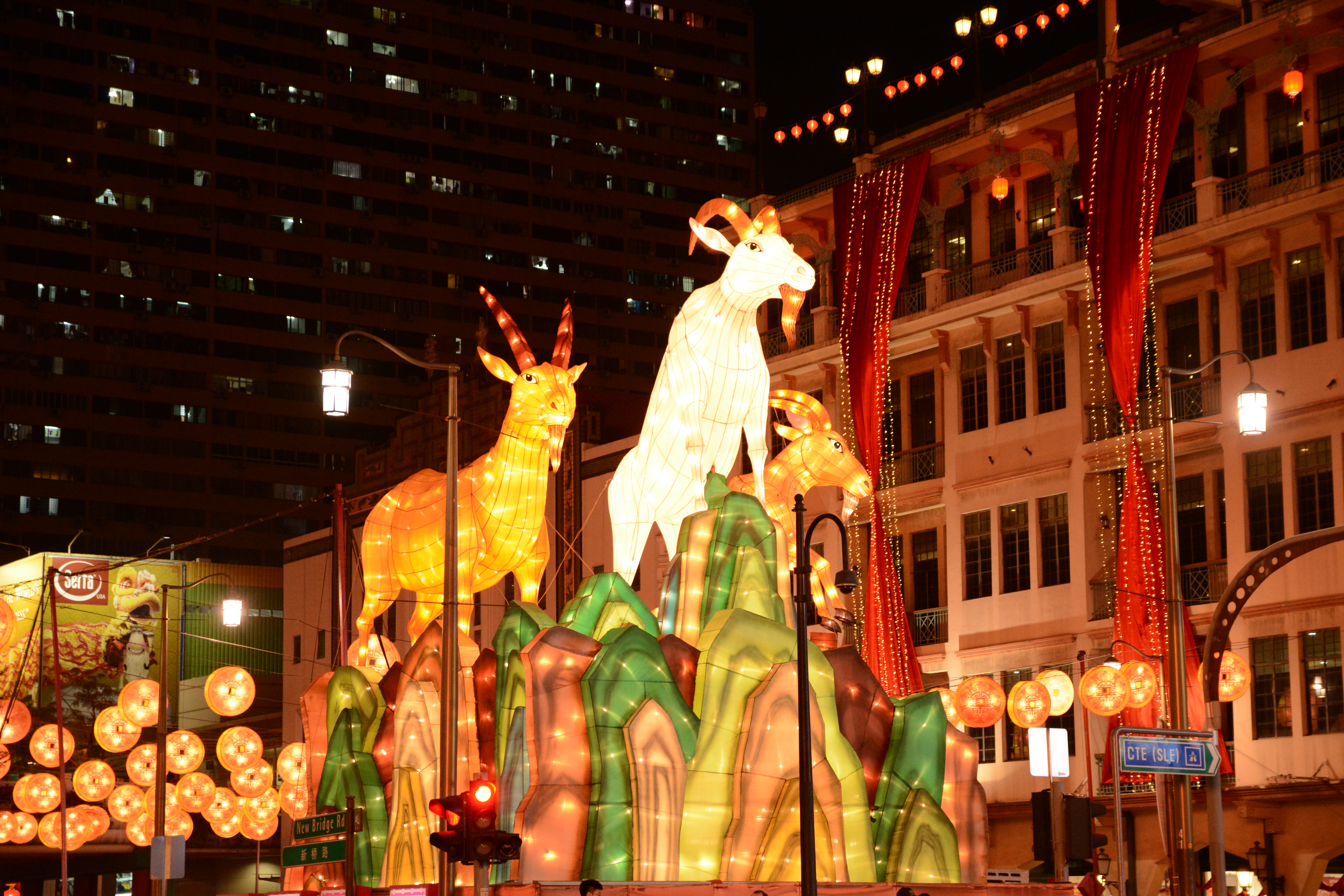
Chinese new year chinatown 2015.

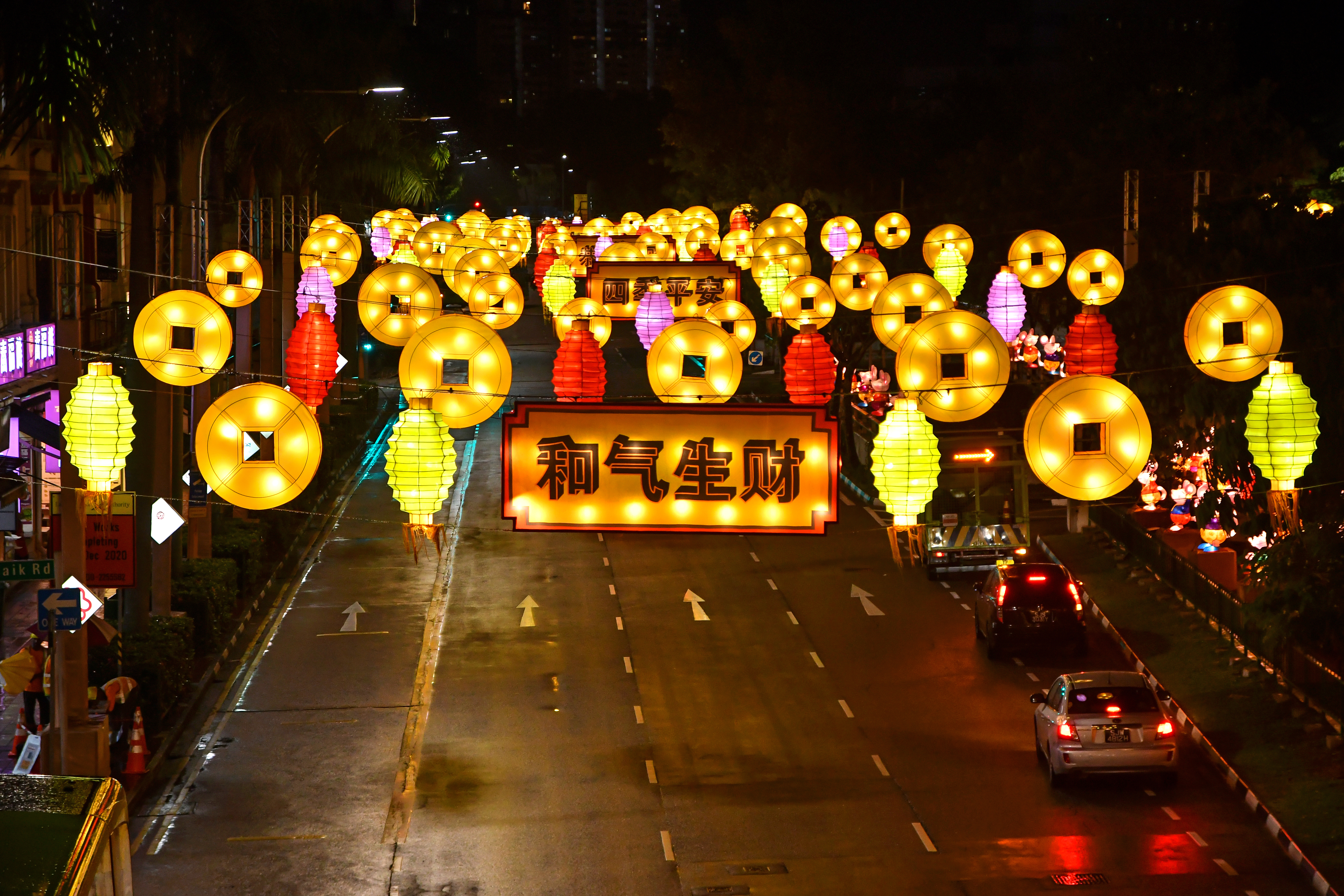
Festive street lighting during Chinese New Year 2020.

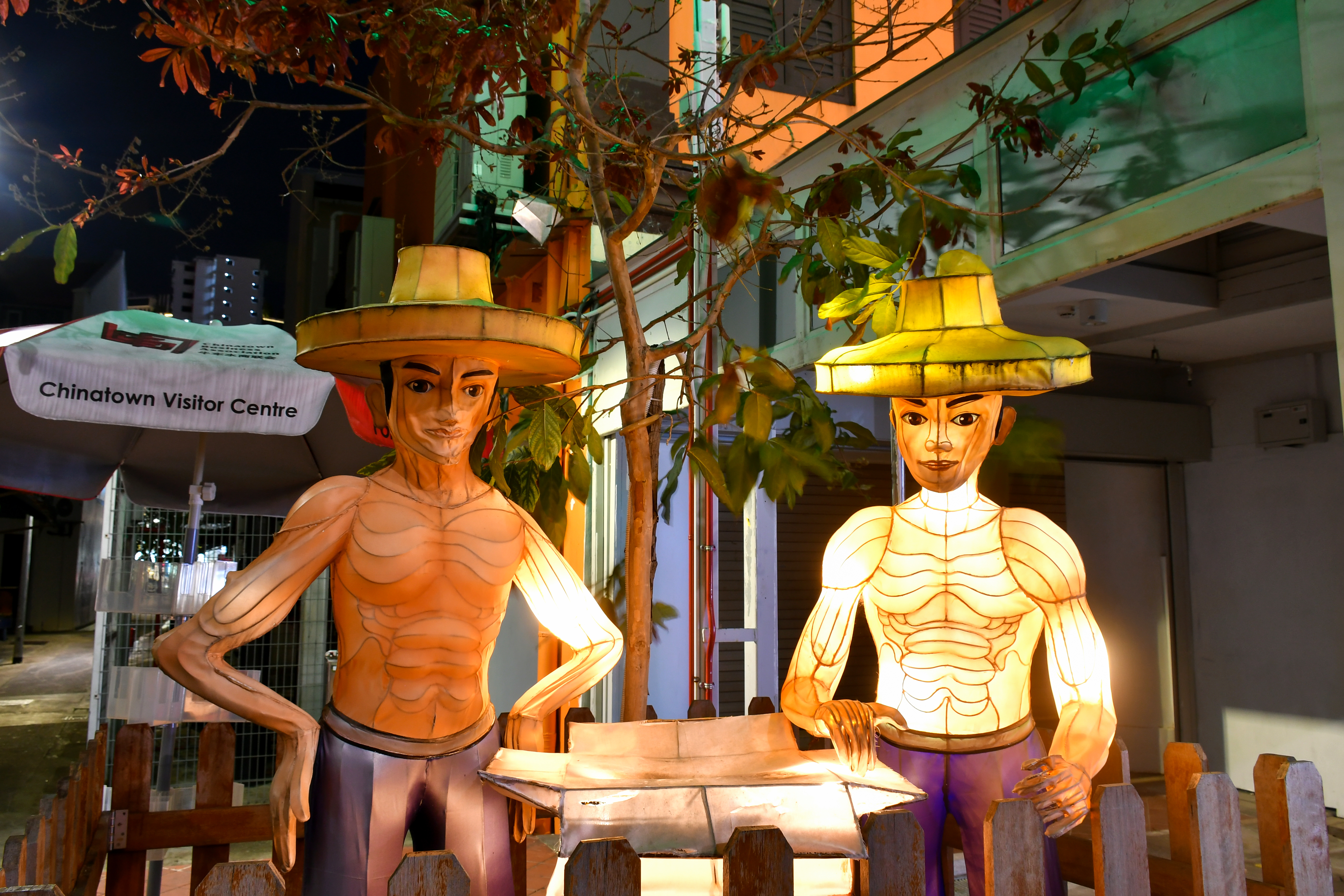
Roadside decorations at Temple Street.

== See also ==
- Chinatowns in Asia
