= Kreta Ayer Road =

Road in Chinatown, Singapore

Coordinates: 1°16′50″N 103°50′32″E

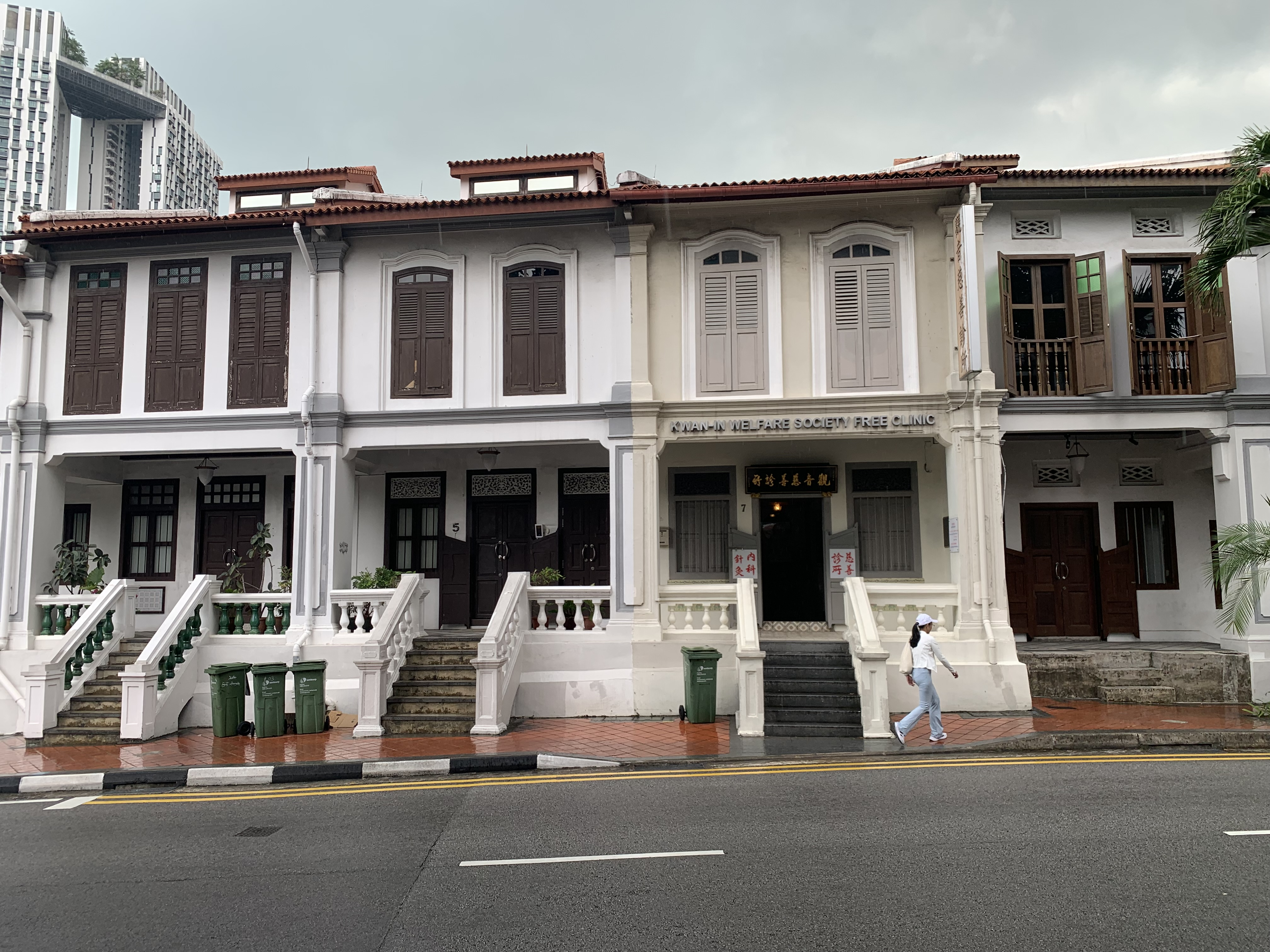
Shophouses on the Kreta Ayer Road

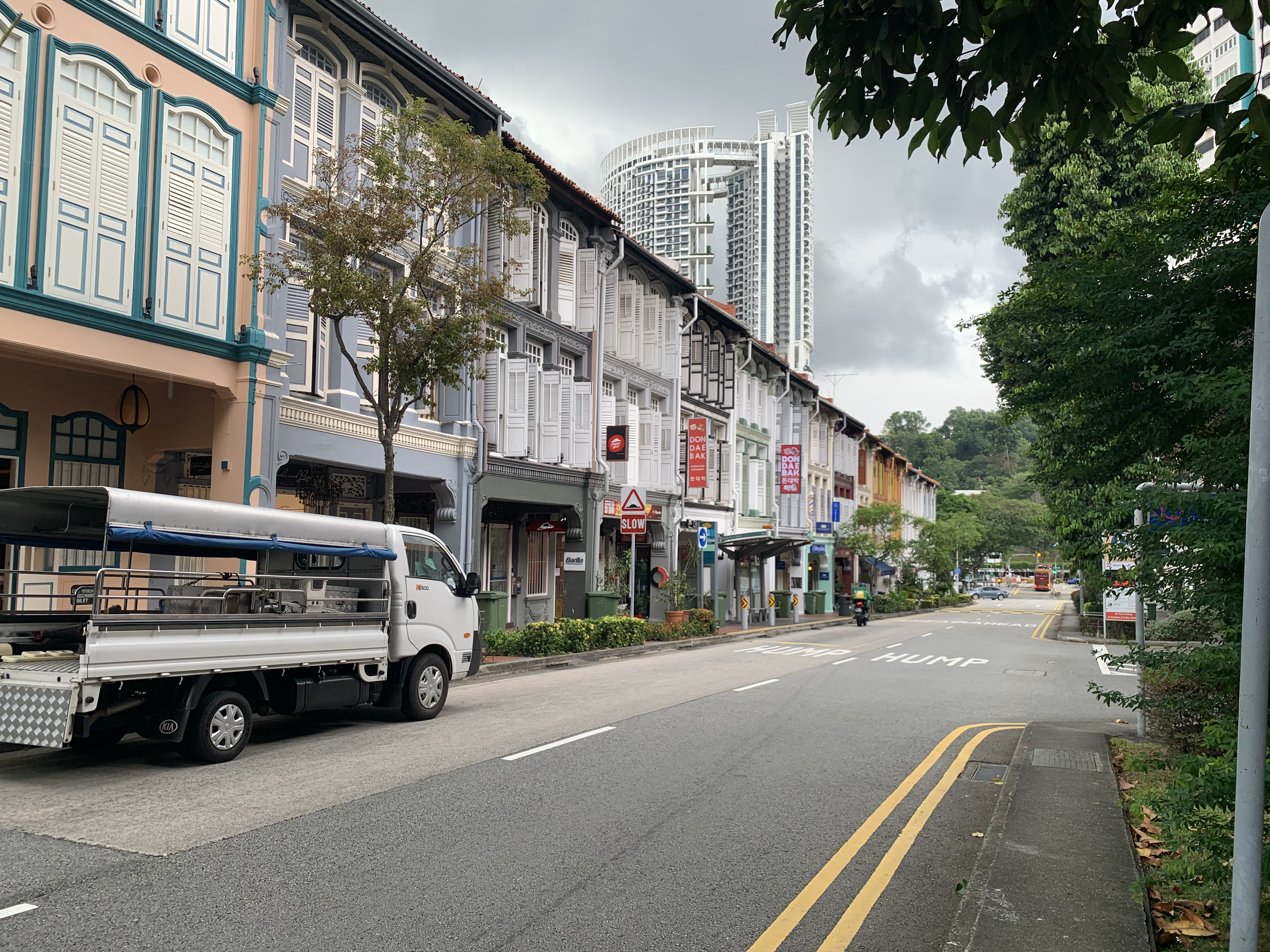
Shophouses on the Kreta Ayer Road

Kreta Ayer Road (IPA: /ˈkreɪtə ˌɑː(j)eɪ/ KRAY-tə AH-yay, (Note: Alternative pronunciations include: /ˈkreɪtɑː-/ KRAY-tah-; /-ˌɑː(j)ɛər/ -AH-yair) Chinese: 水车路 / 水車路) is a one-way road located in Chinatown within the Outram Planning Area in Singapore. The road links Neil Road to New Bridge Road and Eu Tong Sen Street, and is intersected by Keong Saik Road.

== Etymology and history ==
In the early days of Singapore, locals drawn water from a well near Ann Siang Hill and transported them using bullock carts and drove down the street. This led to the area being Kreta Ayer, (Note: Modern spelling: kereta air) which means "water cart" in Malay. Similarly, the Hokkiens called the area gu chia chui while the Cantonese call it ngow chay shui (Chinese: 牛車水; Jyutping: ngau4 ce1 seoi2), both meaning "bullock water cart" (the word "road" is elided).

The road was officially named Kreta Ayer Road in 1922.

For the Chinese, the Chinatown area is referred also as tua poh or "greater town" district. In the 1880s, Kreta Ayer was the red light district of Chinatown. The Chinese traveller, Li Zhongjue, observed in 1887 that the street was a place of restaurants, theatres and brothels and where "filth and dirt are hidden".

== Landmarks ==
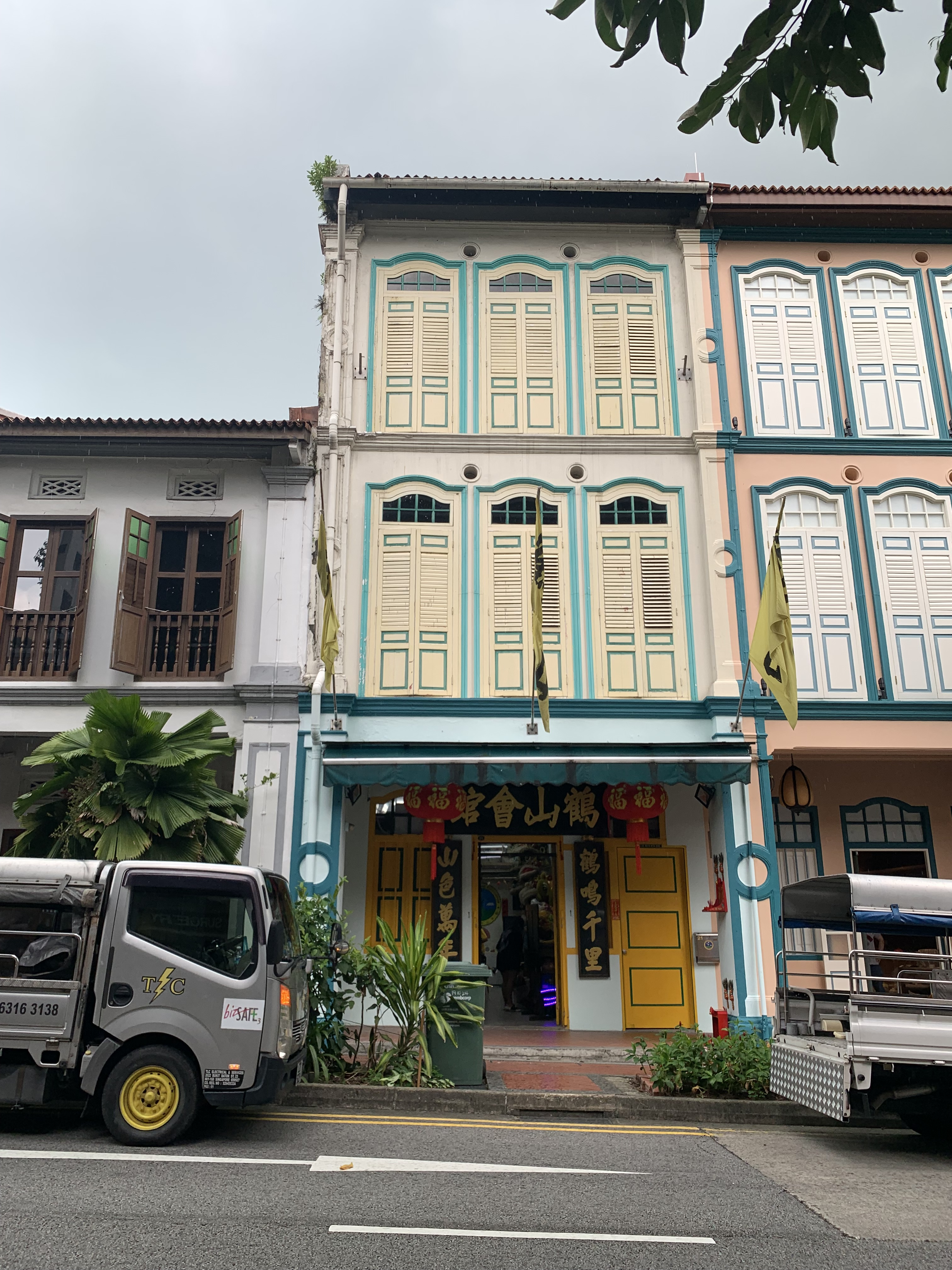
Singapore Hok San Association, at 21 Kreta Ayer Rd

Hok San Association (新加坡鶴山會館) has the oldest lion dance troupe in Singapore, it was established in 1920 and located at No. 21 of the shophouses along Kreta Ayer Road.

Chinese Buddhist Association (新加坡中华佛教会) was founded in 1927 and located at No. 23 of the shophouses along Kreta Ayer Road. It was established after the visit of Venerable Tai Xu (太虚法师) to Singapore in 1926, and is the first Buddhist organisation established in Singapore.
