= Lat Pau =

Former Chinese newspaper in Singapore

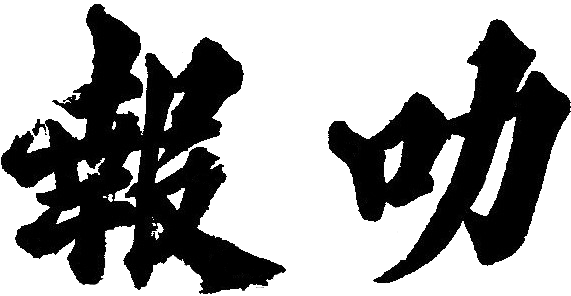

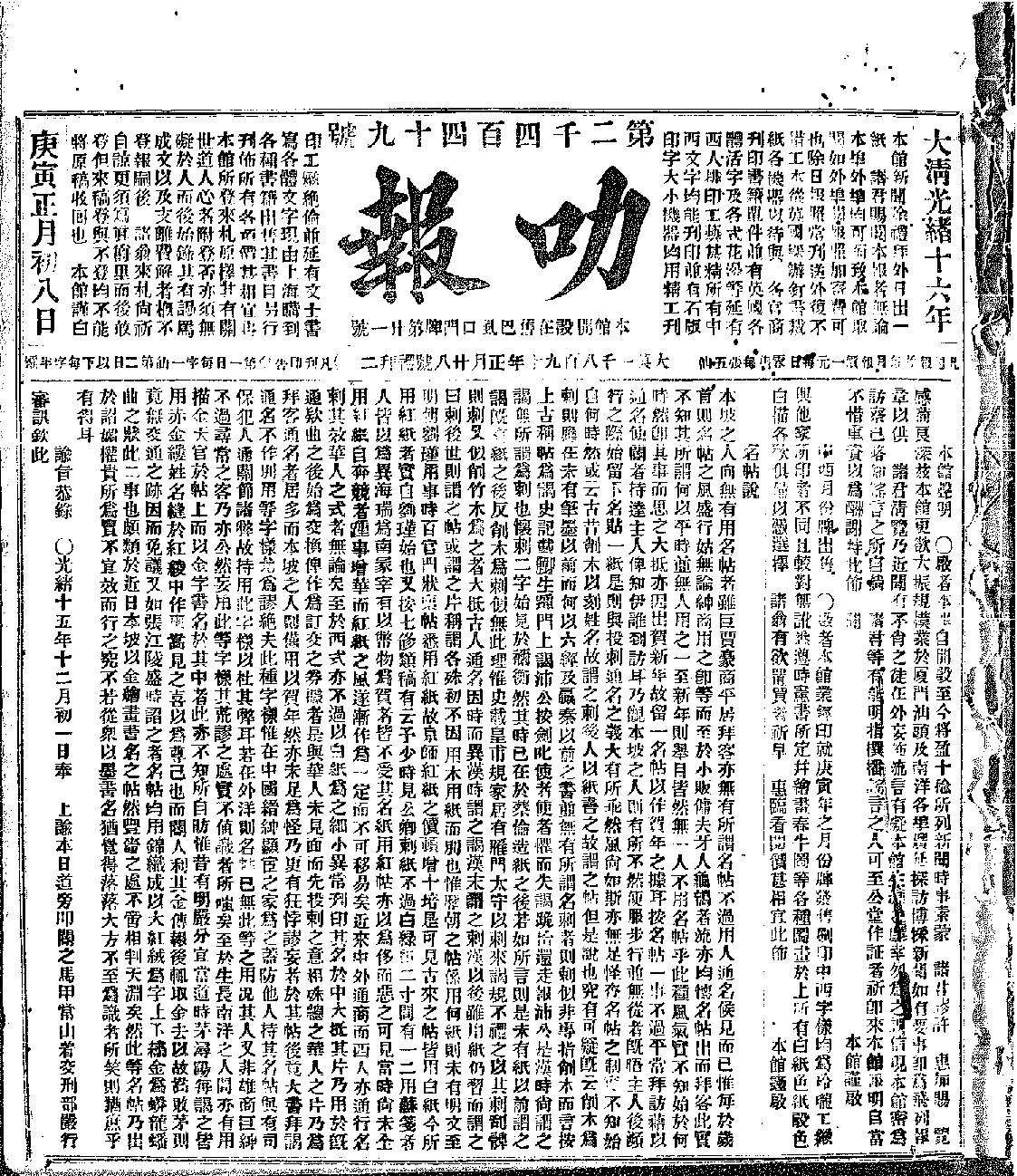
- The Lat Pau, 28 August 1890
- Founder: See Ewe Lay
- Publisher: Lat Pau Press Ltd
- Founded: December 1881
- Ceased publication: March 1932
- Language: Chinese

Lat Pau
- Traditional Chinese: 叻報
- Simplified Chinese: 叻报
Transcriptions
Standard Mandarin
- Hanyu Pinyin: Lè Bào
- Wade–Giles: Lê^{4} Pao^{4}
Hakka
- Romanization: liag6 bau5
Yue: Cantonese
- Jyutping: lek1 bou3
Southern Min
- Hokkien POJ: La̍t Pò
- Teochew Peng'im: lag8 bo3

Lat Pau (Chinese: 叻報; Pe̍h-ōe-jī: La̍t Pò; Wade–Giles: Lê^{4} Pao^{4}) was one of the earliest Chinese-language newspapers published in Singapore under the Straits Settlements. It was first published in December 1881 by See Ewe Lay (Chinese: 薛有禮; Pe̍h-ōe-jī: Sih Ū-lé) under Lat Pau Press Ltd (Chinese: 叻報有限公司). It was published for 52 years, ending in March 1932. It was Singapore's longest-running local-run Chinese newspaper before World War II.

Lat Pau initially was published in Classical Chinese. In 1925 the newspaper started publishing in Vernacular Chinese. The newspaper's first editor was Yeh Chi Yun.

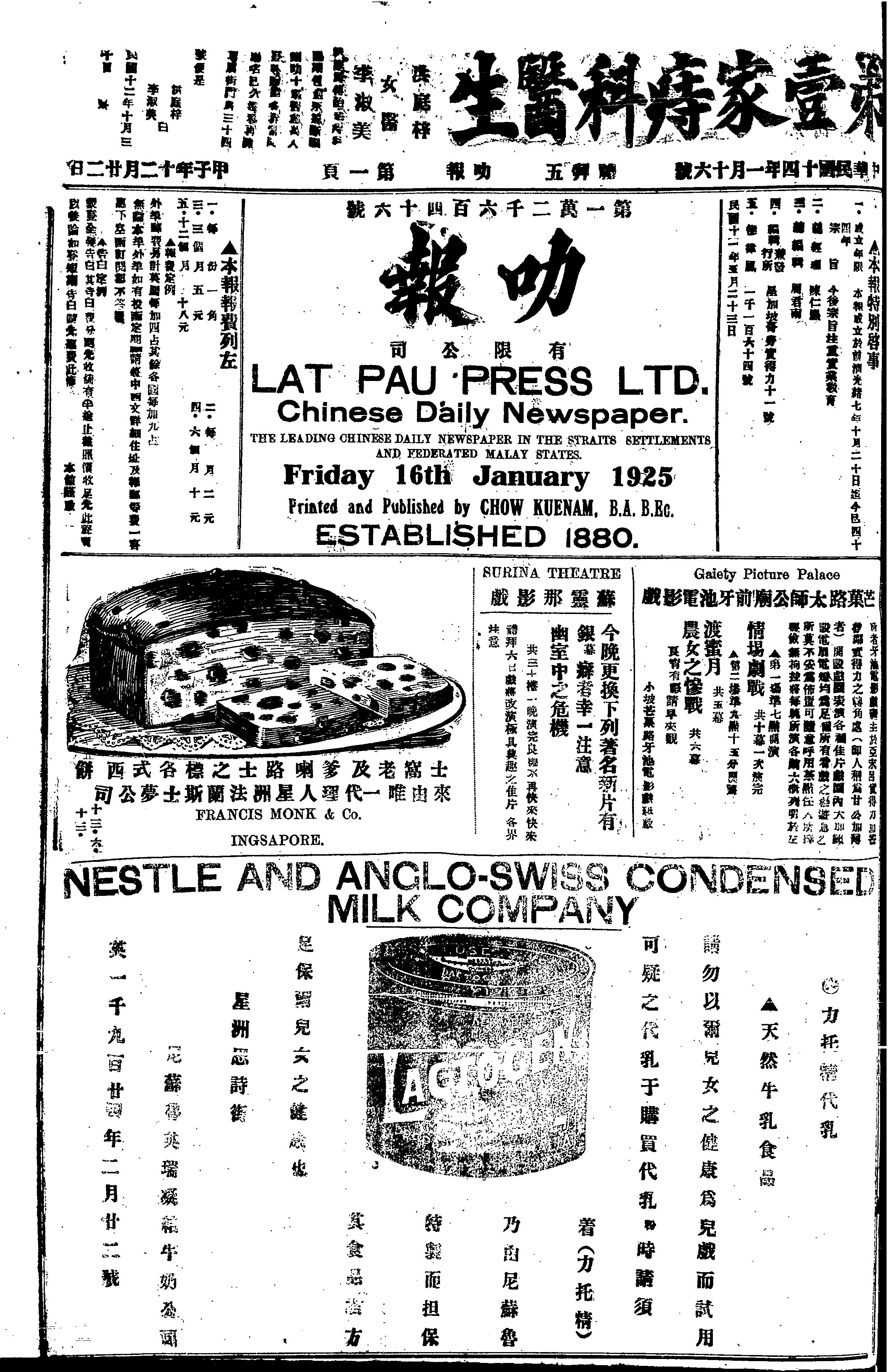
The Lat Pau, 6 January 1925, after the switch to Vernacular Chinese.
