= See Ewe Lay =

See Ewe Lay (c. 1851 - 29 August 1906), alternatively spelled Seet Ewe Lay, was a descendant of the wealthy Peranakan See clan and the founder of Lat Pau, the first major Chinese newspaper in Singapore.

== Biography ==
See was born in Malacca in about 1851. He was the eldest son of See Eng Wat, a prominent Chinese merchant, the grandson of See Hoot Kee, a leader of the early Hokkien communities in Malacca and Singapore, and the older brother See Ewe Boon, who became the comprador of the Hong Kong and Shanghai Bank in Singapore. He frequently accompanied his father on business trips to Xiamen. See came to Singapore to join the Hong Kong and Shanghai Bank as a comprador.

See founded Lat Pau, the first major Chinese newspaper in Singapore, in 1881, despite being proficient in English. He founded the paper for an unknown reason, possibly either for profit, or to raise social awareness and cultural standards. During the Baring crisis, See insisted publishing Lat Pau. Following the death of Municipal Board member Lim Eng Keng, the Singapore Free Press & Mercantile Advertiser suggested that See be nominated to join the board in 1892, due to his proficiency in English, as well as his occupation as the editor and proprietor of Lat Pau, which forced him to keep up with the times. However, he turned down the invitation to be elected as its board member, as he wanted to focus on publishing Lat Pau instead.

== Personal life ==
See married a daughter of prominent Hokkien merchant Chia Ann Siang. He died of a sudden heart attack on 29 August 1906 at his residence on 93 Chin Swee Road. Following his death, his son, See Tiow Hyong, took over propriertorship of Lat Pao.
