= Mosque Street, Singapore =

Street in Chinatown, Singapore

Coordinates: 1.2838°N 103.8448°E

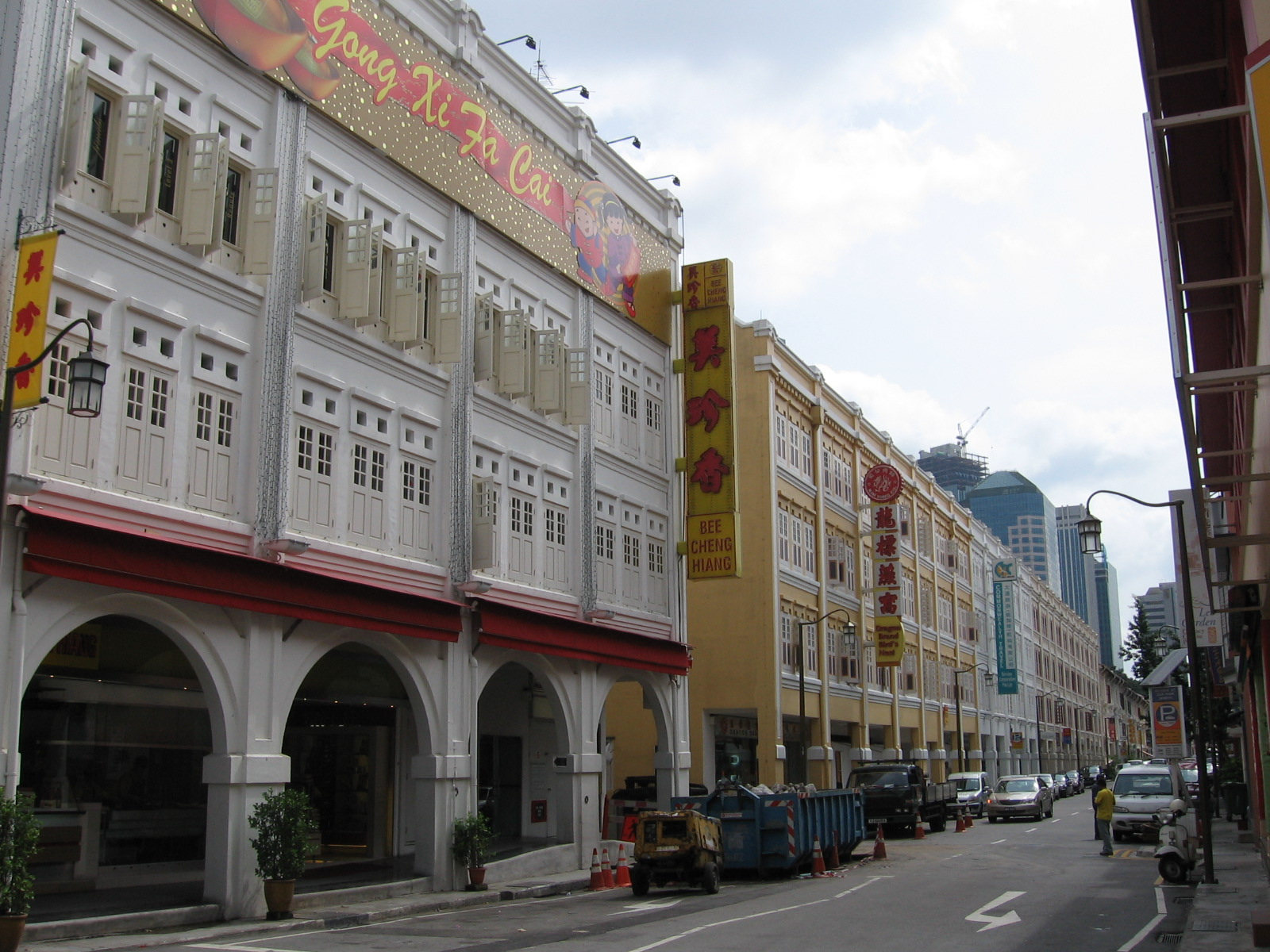
Mosque Street, Chinatown, Singapore

Mosque Street (Chinese: 摩士街; Malay: Lebuh Masjid) is a one-way street located in Chinatown within the Outram Planning Area in Singapore. The road links South Bridge Road to New Bridge Road near Chinatown MRT station.

== Etymology and history ==
The street used to have ten stables located there. After the Masjid Jamae was constructed at the current site between 1830 and 1835, the street was named after it.

It is also known as kit ling bio pi in Hokkien, meaning "beside the King's temple".
