= List of hotels in Singapore =

The list of hotels in Singapore provides hotel names by location within Singapore.

== By location ==
=== Central ===
- Goodwood Park Hotel
- Rendezvous Hotel Singapore

=== Chinatown ===
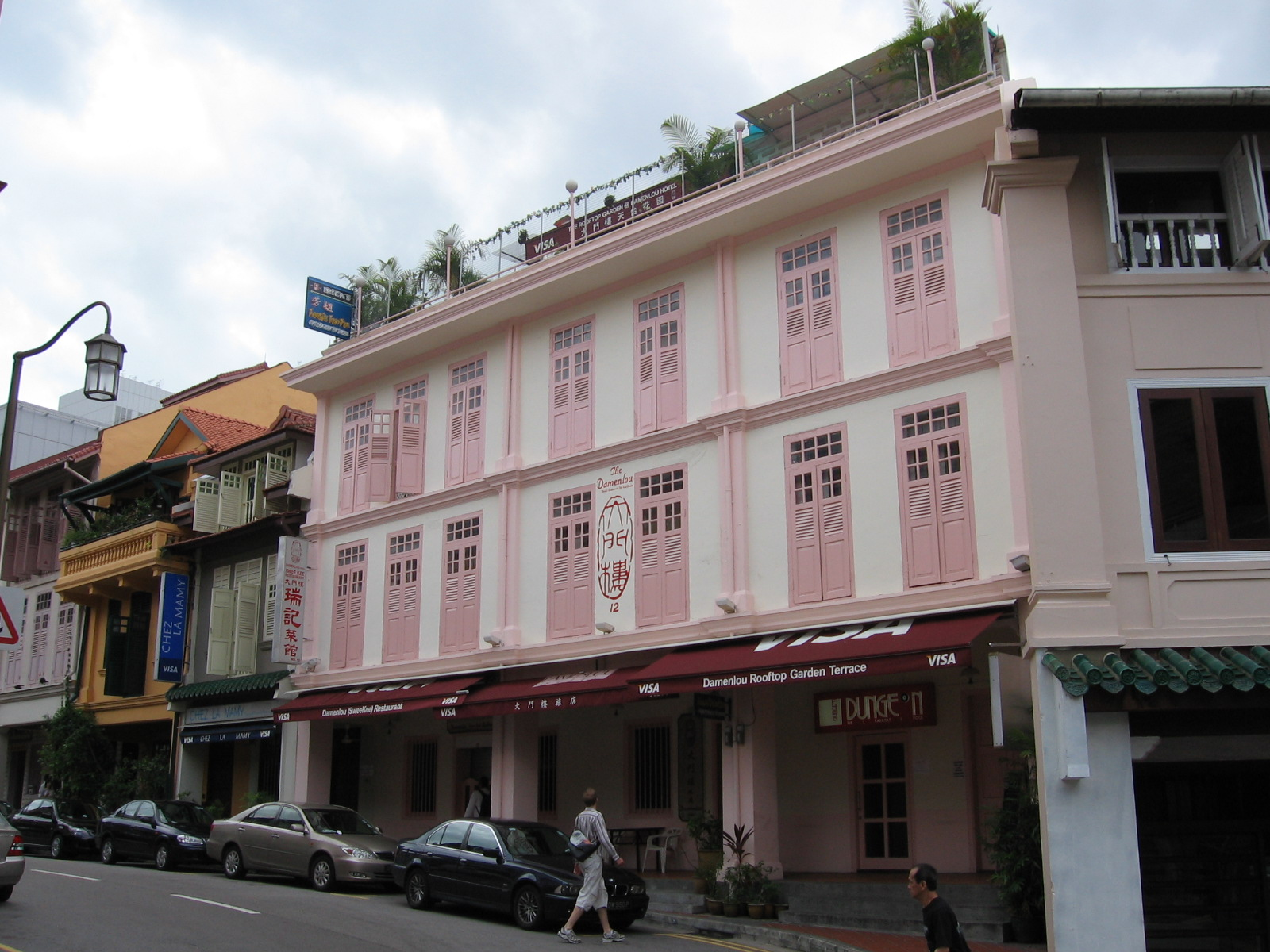
The Damenlou Hotel

- Damenlou Hotel
- New Majestic Hotel
- The Scarlet Singapore

=== Downtown ===
- Fairmont Singapore
- Oasia Hotel Downtown
- Parkroyal Collection Pickering
- Raffles Hotel
- The New 7th Storey Hotel
- South Beach Tower
- Swissôtel The Stamford

=== Marina Centre ===
- Conrad Singapore Marina Bay
- The Fullerton Hotel Singapore
- Mandarin Oriental
- Marina Bay Sands
- The Pan Pacific Singapore
- Parkroyal Collection Marina Bay
- The Ritz-Carlton Millenia Singapore

=== Orchard Road ===
- Hilton Singapore Orchard
- Holiday Inn Park View Singapore
- Shangri-La Hotel Singapore
- St Regis Singapore

=== Sentosa ===
- Capella Singapore
- Crockfords Tower, formerly planned to be named Maxims Tower, is an 11-storey all-suite hotel overlooking the Singapore harbour and the Southern Islands. The resort's casino is located beneath the tower. The hotel was topped-out on 27 February 2009 and opened on 20 January 2010. Both the latter and Hotel Michael (11-storey hotel named after Michael Graves, topped out on 15 July 2009 and was opened on 20 January 2010), sits on the area of the former Sentosa Musical Fountain. The hotel also features Crockfords Premier, a casino club with private rooms for high rollers located on the 10th floor.

== Former hotels ==
- Sloane Court Hotel

== Gallery ==
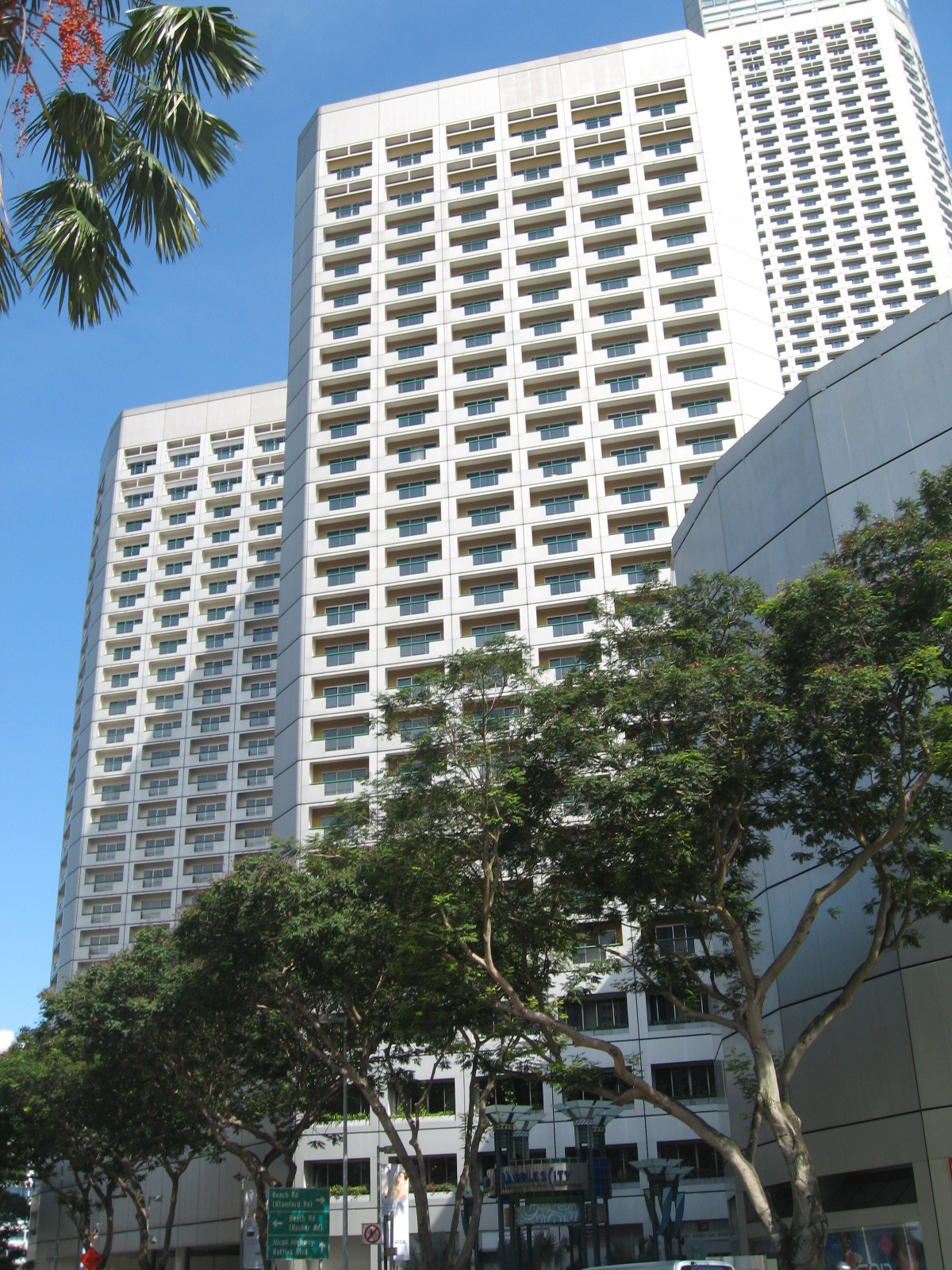
Fairmont Singapore

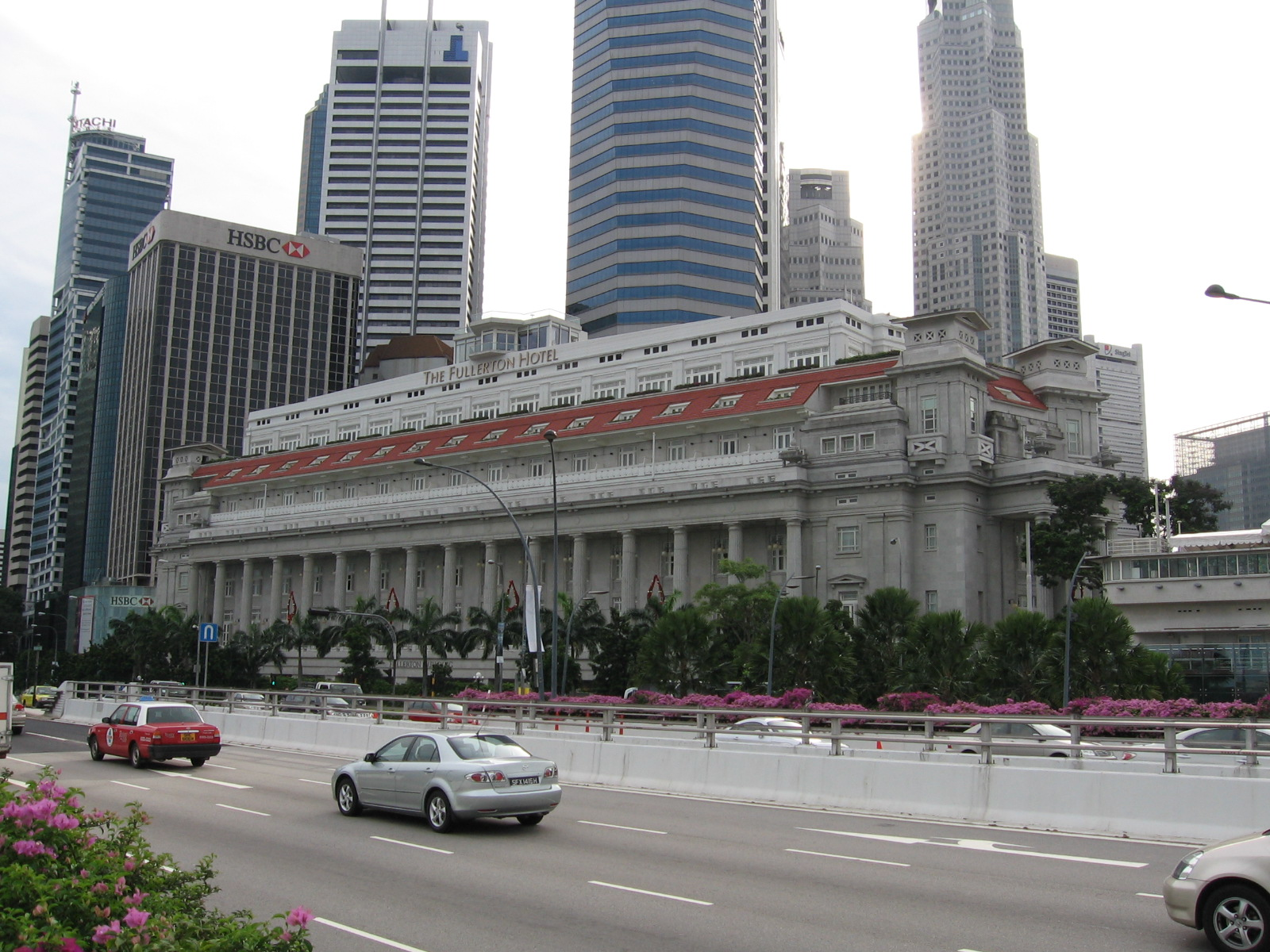
The Fullerton Hotel Singapore

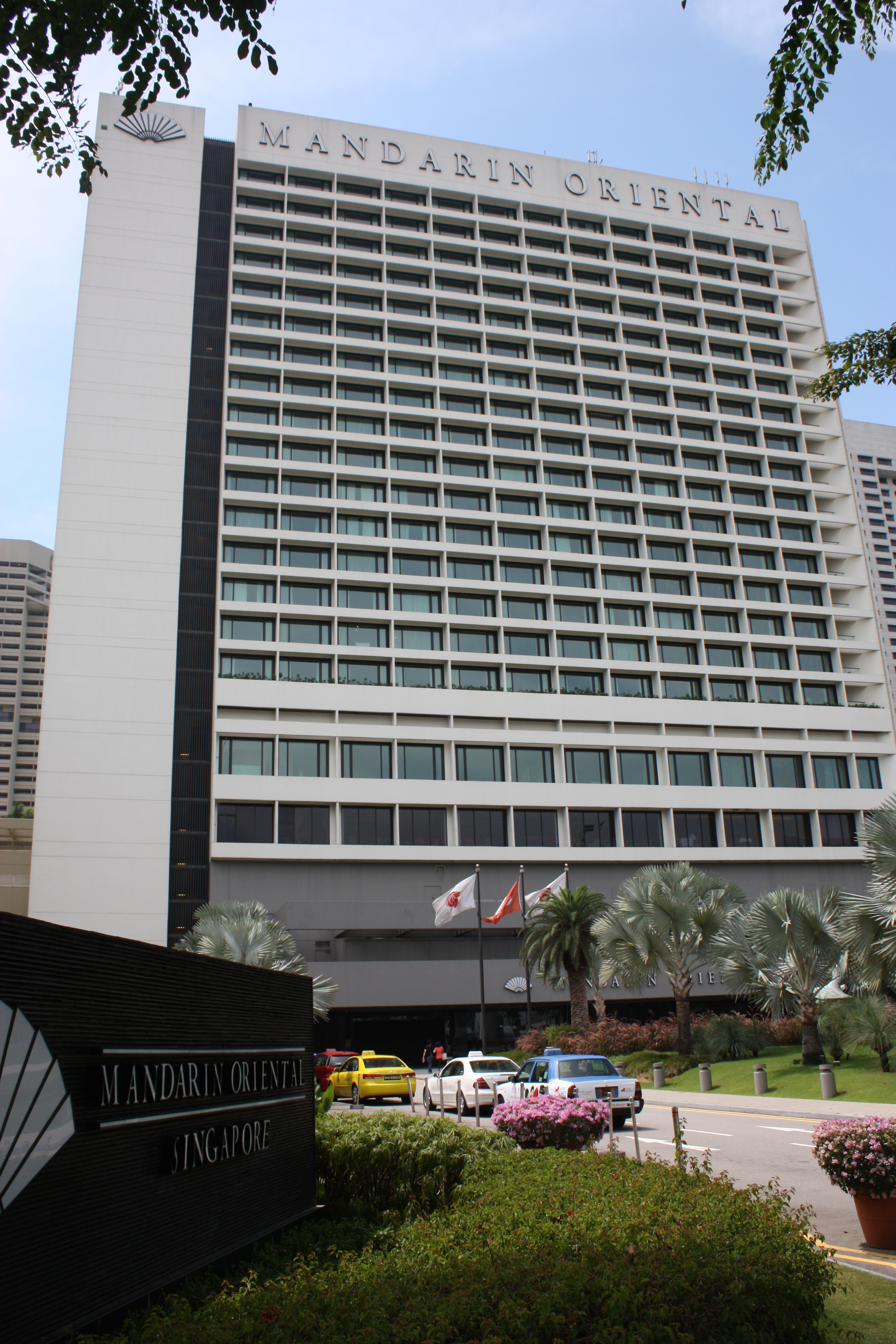
Mandarin Oriental Singapore

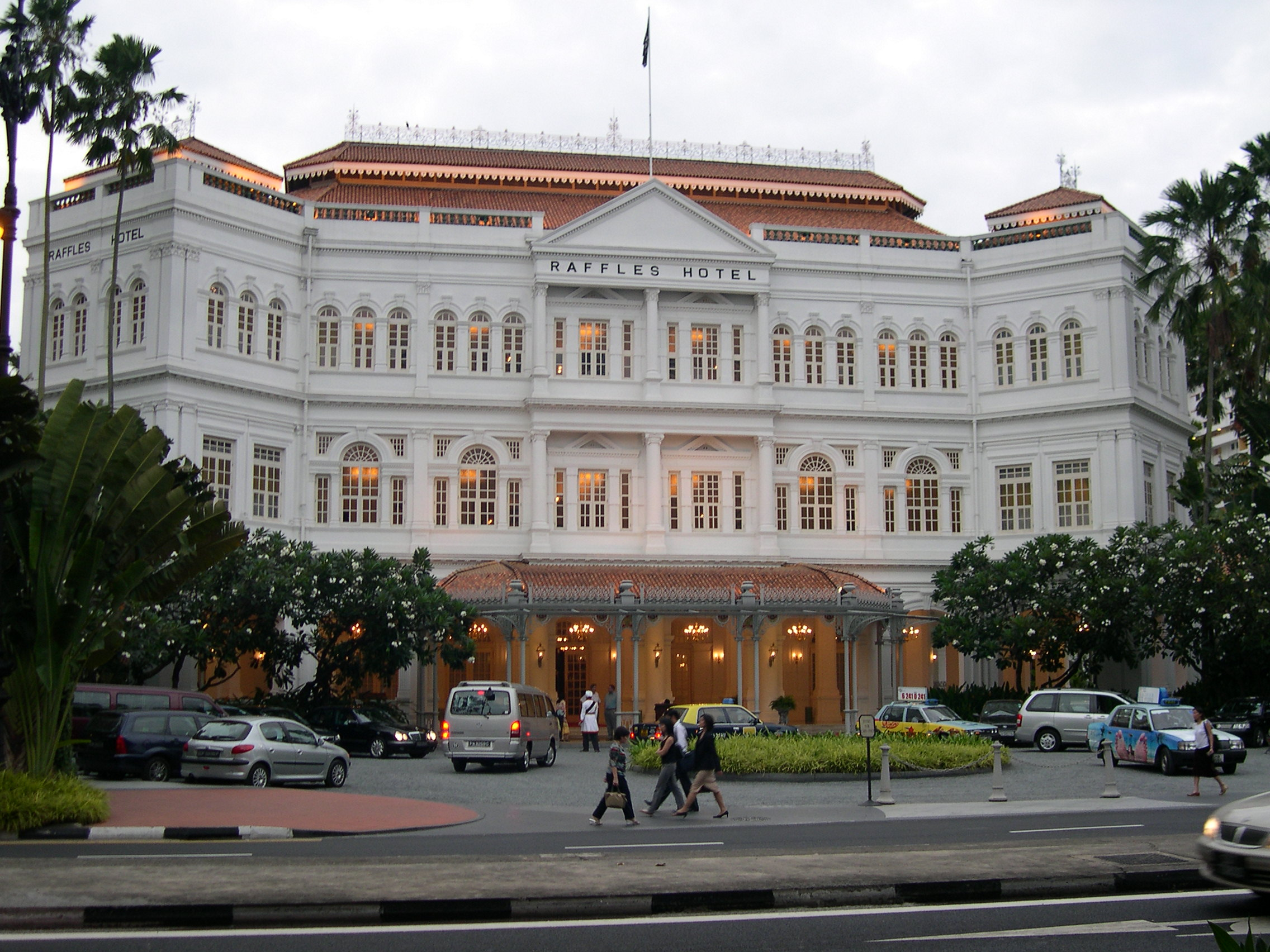
Raffles Hotel

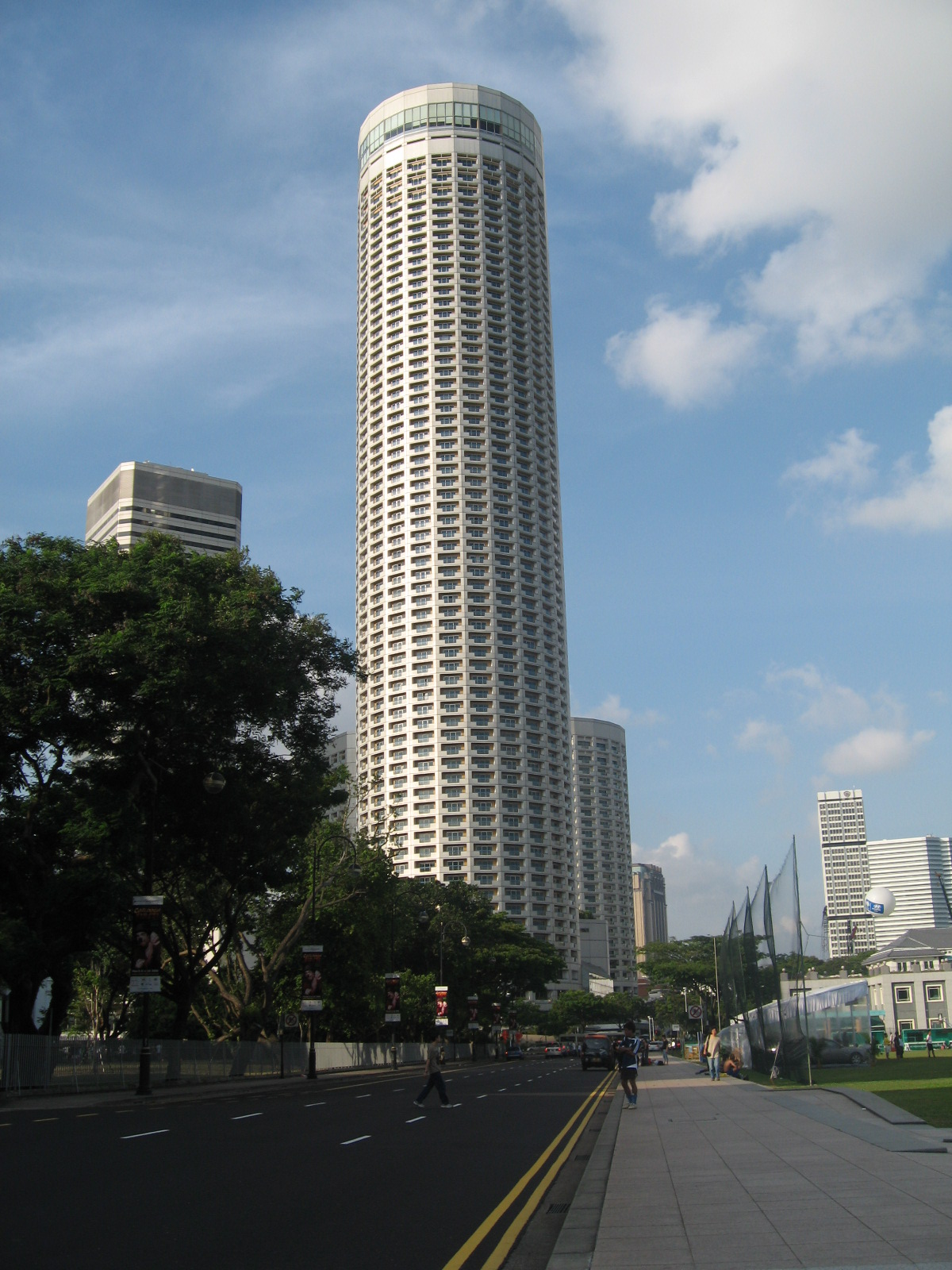
Swissôtel The Stamford

== See also ==
- Lists of hotels – an index of hotel list articles on Wikipedia
