= Erskine Road =

Street in Chinatown, Singapore

Coordinates: 1.2809°N 103.8452°E

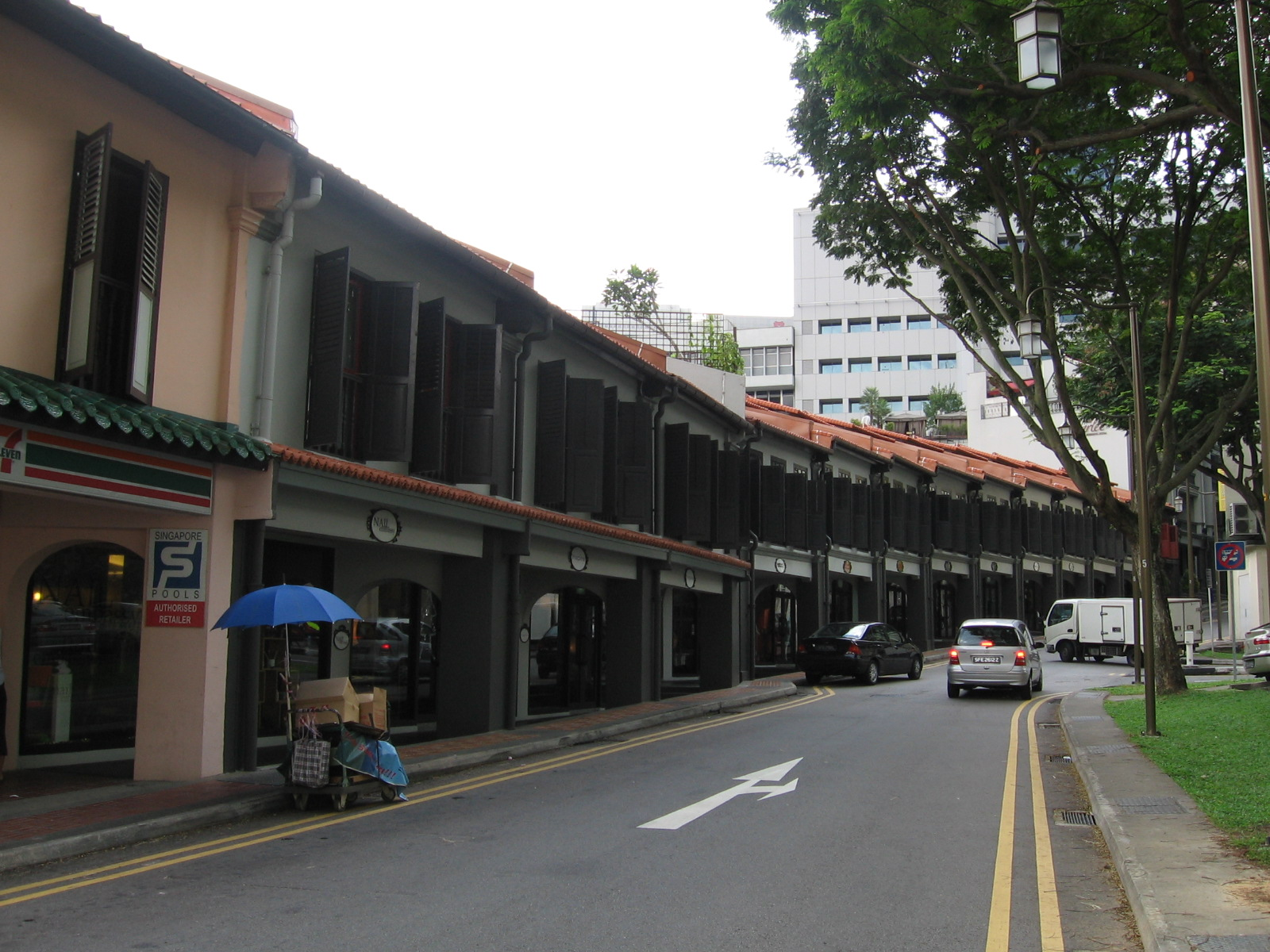
Erskine Road, Chinatown, Singapore.

Erskine Road (Chinese: 厄士金路, Malay: Jalan Erskine), commonly known as Machefang Jie (Chinese: 马车房街; pinyin: Mǎchēfáng jiē) in the past, is a one-way road located in Chinatown within the Outram Planning Area in Singapore.

Erskine Road starts at its junction with South Bridge Road and ends with its junction with Ann Siang Road and Kadayanallur Street.

== Etymology and history ==
The road was named in 1907. It may be named after Samuel Erskine of Howarth Erskine and Company, an engineering company in the 1870s, or after J.J. Erskine, a government officer who was recorded owning land in Singapore in 1824. Given that the road was named in 1907, the former (Samuel) is more likely than the latter.

== See also ==
- The Scarlet Hotel
