= Thian Hock Keng Temple =

Mazu temple in Singapore

- 天福宮
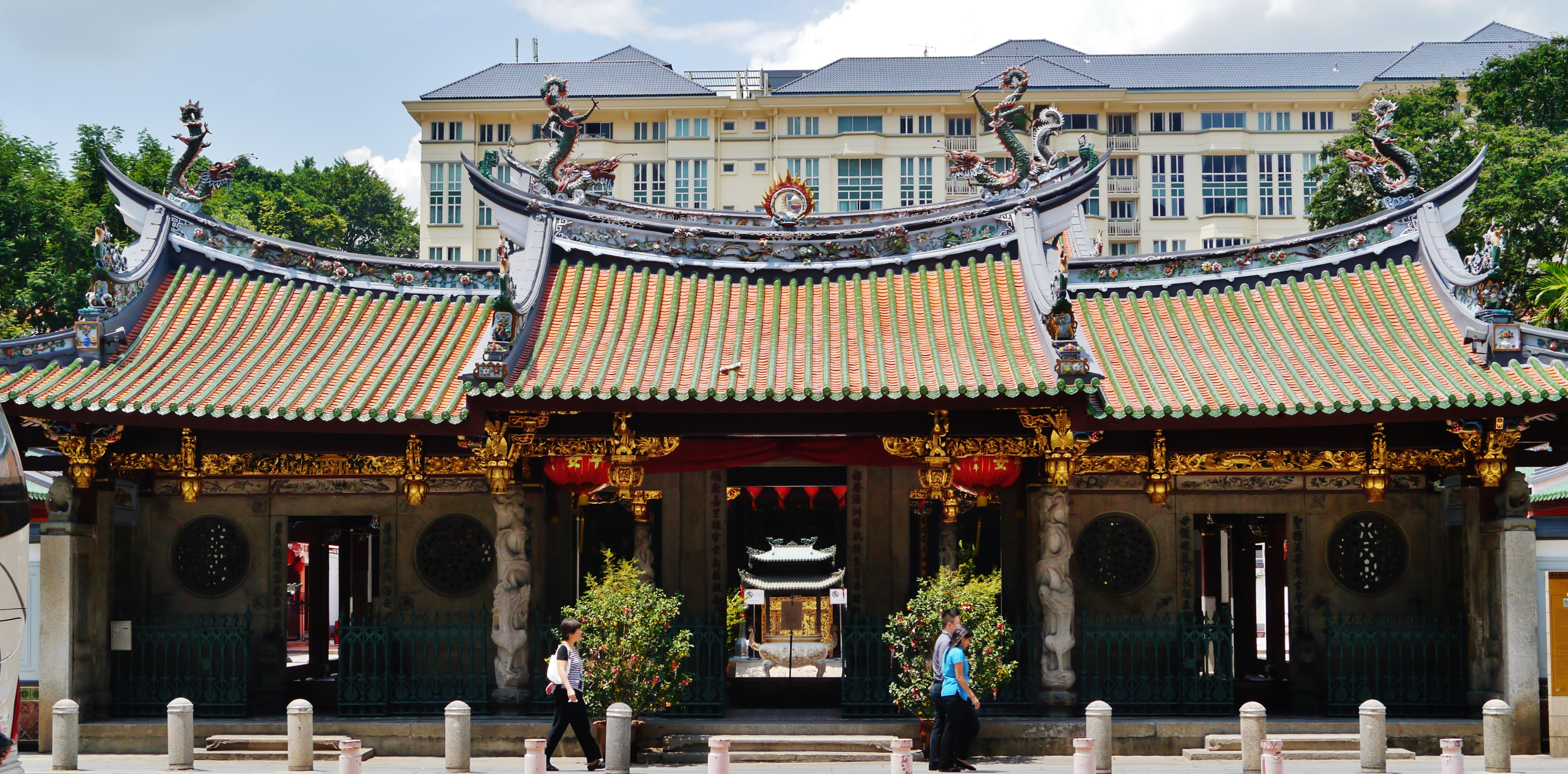
- Thian Hock Keng Temple
- Interactive map of Thian Hock Keng Temple

Monastery information
- Order: Mazuism, Taoism, Confucianism, Buddhism
- Established: 1821 to 1822; 204 years ago

Architecture
- Style: Hokkien architecture
- Groundbreaking: 1839; 187 years ago
- Completed date: 1842; 184 years ago
- Construction cost: 30,000 spanish dollars

Site
- Location: 158 Telok Ayer Street, Singapore 068613
- Country: Singapore
- Coordinates: 1°16′51.8″N 103°50′51.1″E
- Website: www.thianhockkeng.com.sg

Thian Hock Keng Temple
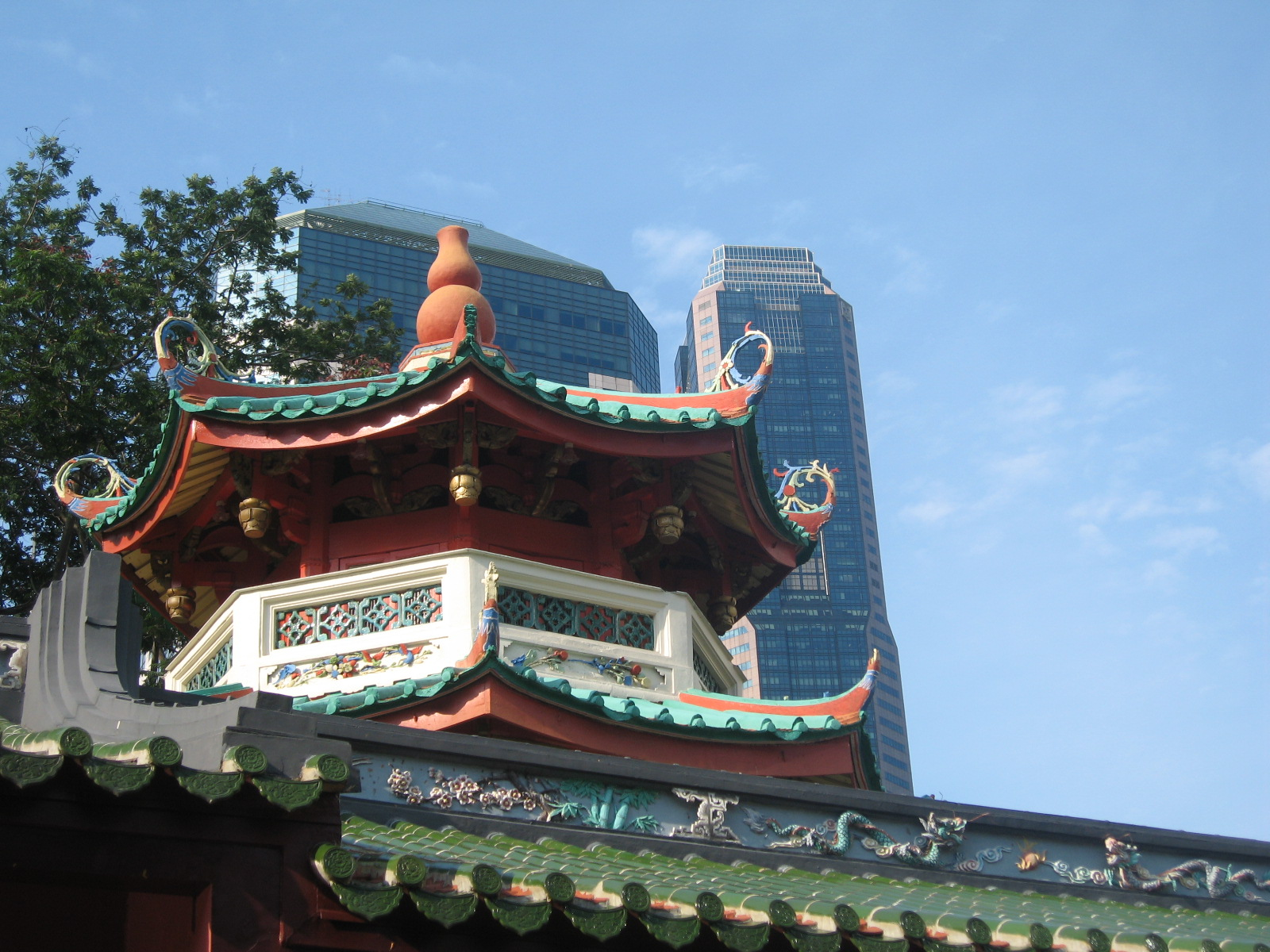
- Keng Teck Huay Pagoda
- Traditional Chinese: 天福宮
- Literal meaning: Palace of Heavenly Happiness
Transcriptions
Standard Mandarin
- Hanyu Pinyin: Tiānfú Gōng
Southern Min
- Hokkien POJ: Thian-hok-keng

Thian Hock Keng Temple (Chinese: 天福宮; Pe̍h-ōe-jī: Thian-hok-keng; pinyin: Tiānfú Gōng or the Tianfu Temple, literally "Palace of Heavenly Happiness"), is a temple built for the worship of Mazu, a Chinese sea goddess, in Outram, Singapore.

It is the oldest and most important temple of the Hokkien (Hoklo) people in the country. At the back is a Mahayana Buddhist shrine dedicated to Guanyin, the bodhisattva of mercy. Thian Hock Keng was gazetted as a national monument on 6 July 1973.

== History ==
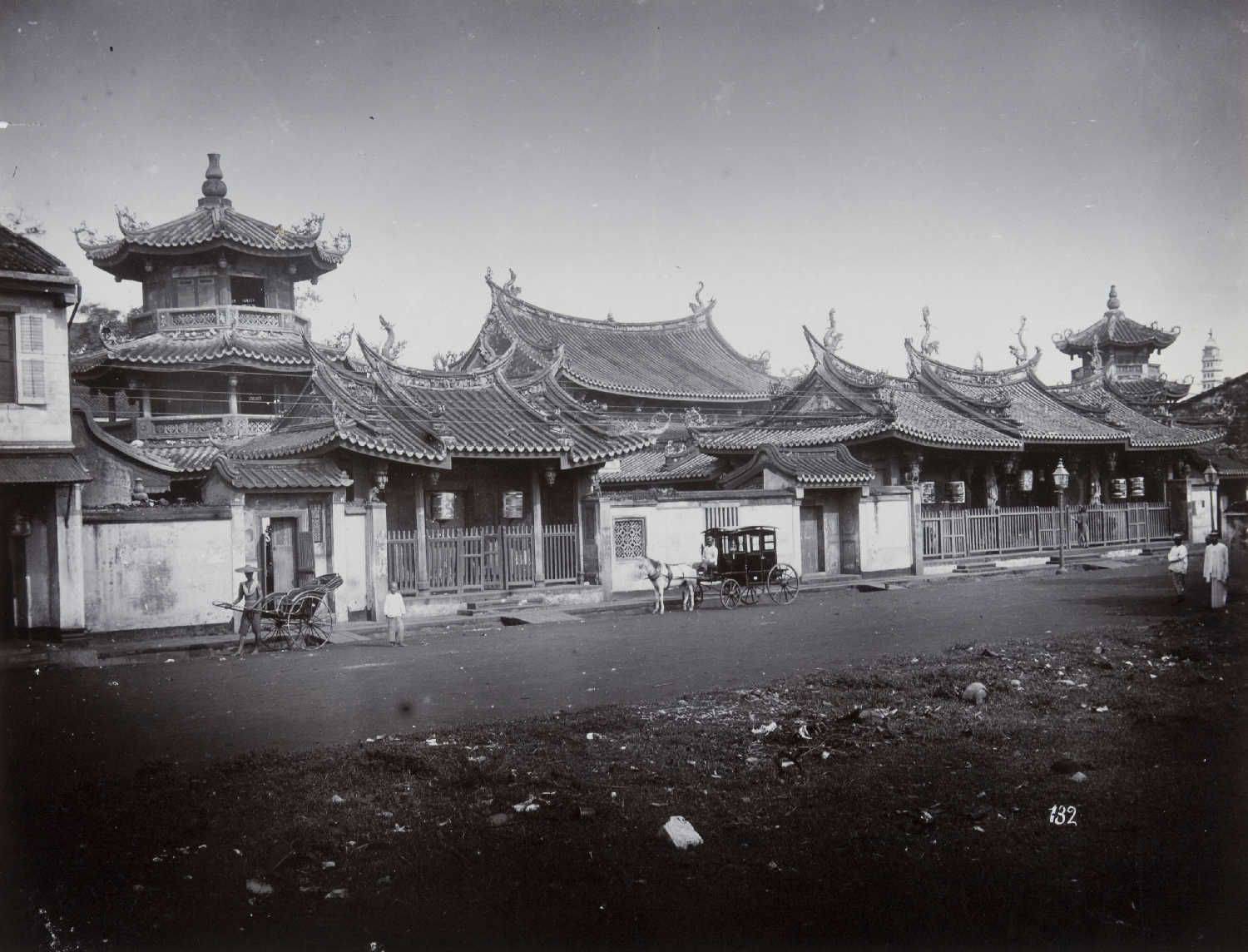
Thian Hock Keng Temple, c. 1880 to 1910

The temple originated as a small Joss house first built around 1821–1822 at the waterfront serving the local Hokkien community, where seafarers and immigrants gave thanks to the sea goddess Mazu for a safe sea passage on their arrival to Singapore. The temple, located on Telok Ayer Street, originally faced the sea; the Telok Ayer Street used to be situated along the coastline before land reclamation work began in the 1880s.

Starting in 1839, the temple was rebuilt with funds collected over the years and donations from the community, the largest of which was from Tan Tock Seng, a Hokkien businessman. The building materials of the temple and a statue of Mazu was brought over from China, and the statue enshrined in the main hall of the temple in 1840. Some of the building materials, such as stone for the columns, timber as well as tiles were recycled from ballasts in ships. The local Indian community of Chulia Street also helped build the temple, and a statue of a man who appears to be an Indian holding a beam up at the ceiling was placed in the right wing as a reminder and gesture for their contribution. The temple was completed in 1842 at a cost of 30,000 Spanish dollars.

In 1840, the clan association Hokkien Huay Kuan serving the Hokkien community was formed within the temple ground of Thian Hock Keng. In 1849, the Chung Wen Pagoda and Chong Boon Gate were added to the right of the main temple. The building was renovated in 1906, and some 'western-style' features were added, such as a wrought-iron gate from Glasgow and dado tiling. A scroll and plaque were presented to the temple by Guangxu Emperor to the temple in 1907. The Chong Hock Pavilion was built in 1913, and was once used by the Chong Hock Girls' School established in the temple.

On 6 July 1973, the temple was gazetted as a national monument of Singapore.

A major renovation of the temple was initiated in 1998 and completed in 2000 at a cost of US$2.2 million. The renovation received an honourable mention from the UNESCO Asia-Pacific Awards for Cultural Heritage Conservation in 2001.

== Architecture ==
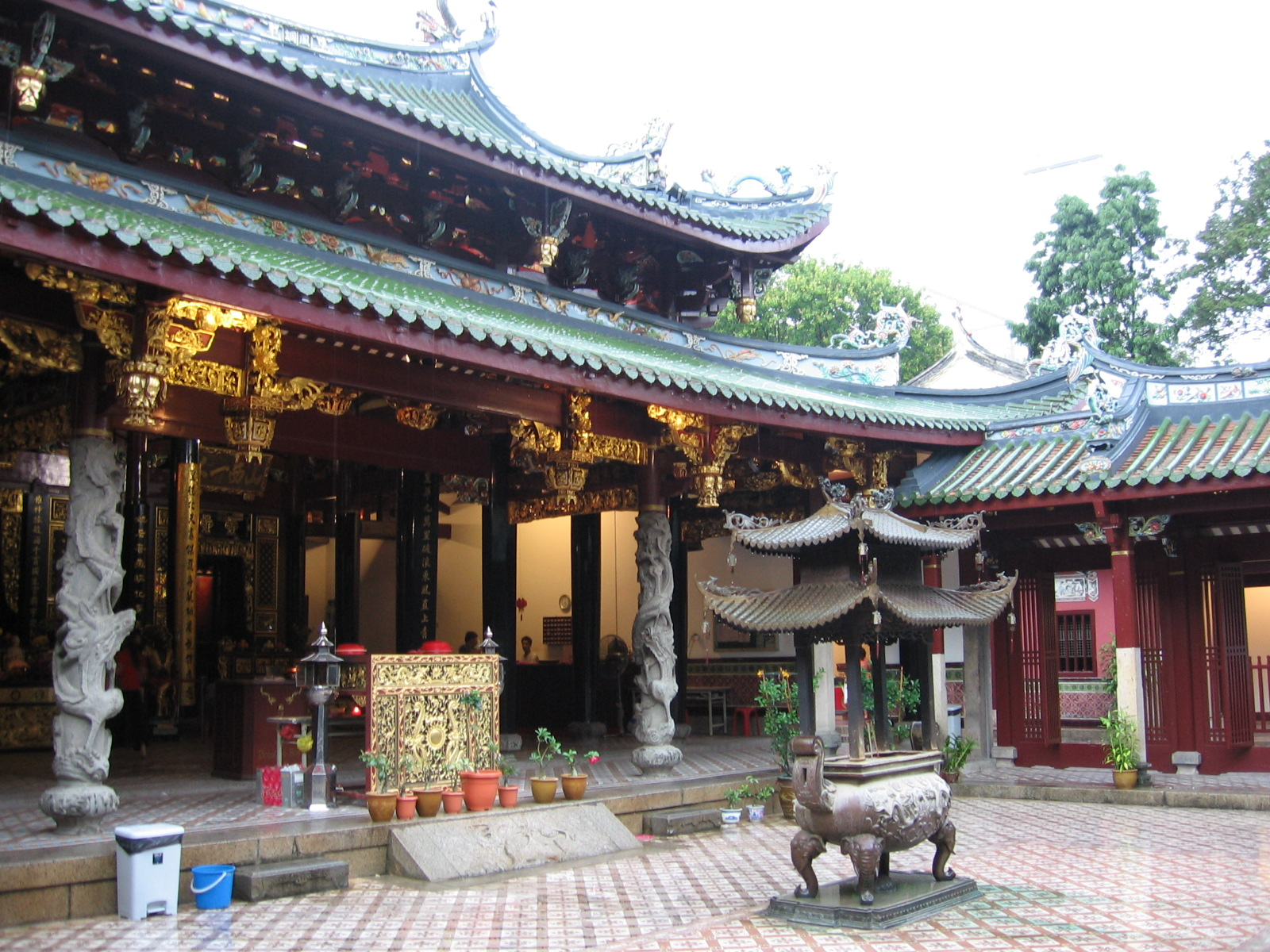
Courtyard and front of main temple

Thian Hock Keng, built on a square site, is of traditional Chinese design whereby a group of buildings or pavilions cluster around the main courtyard. It has the standard layout of three halls commonly found in such temples – an entrance hall, a main hall, and a rear hall. The temple is constructed in the temple architecture style commonly found in Fujian. The main halls are of single-storey beam-frame structures with brackets supporting curving roofs with wide eaves. Dragons and other decorative motifs are placed on the roofs of the entrance hall as well as the main hall.

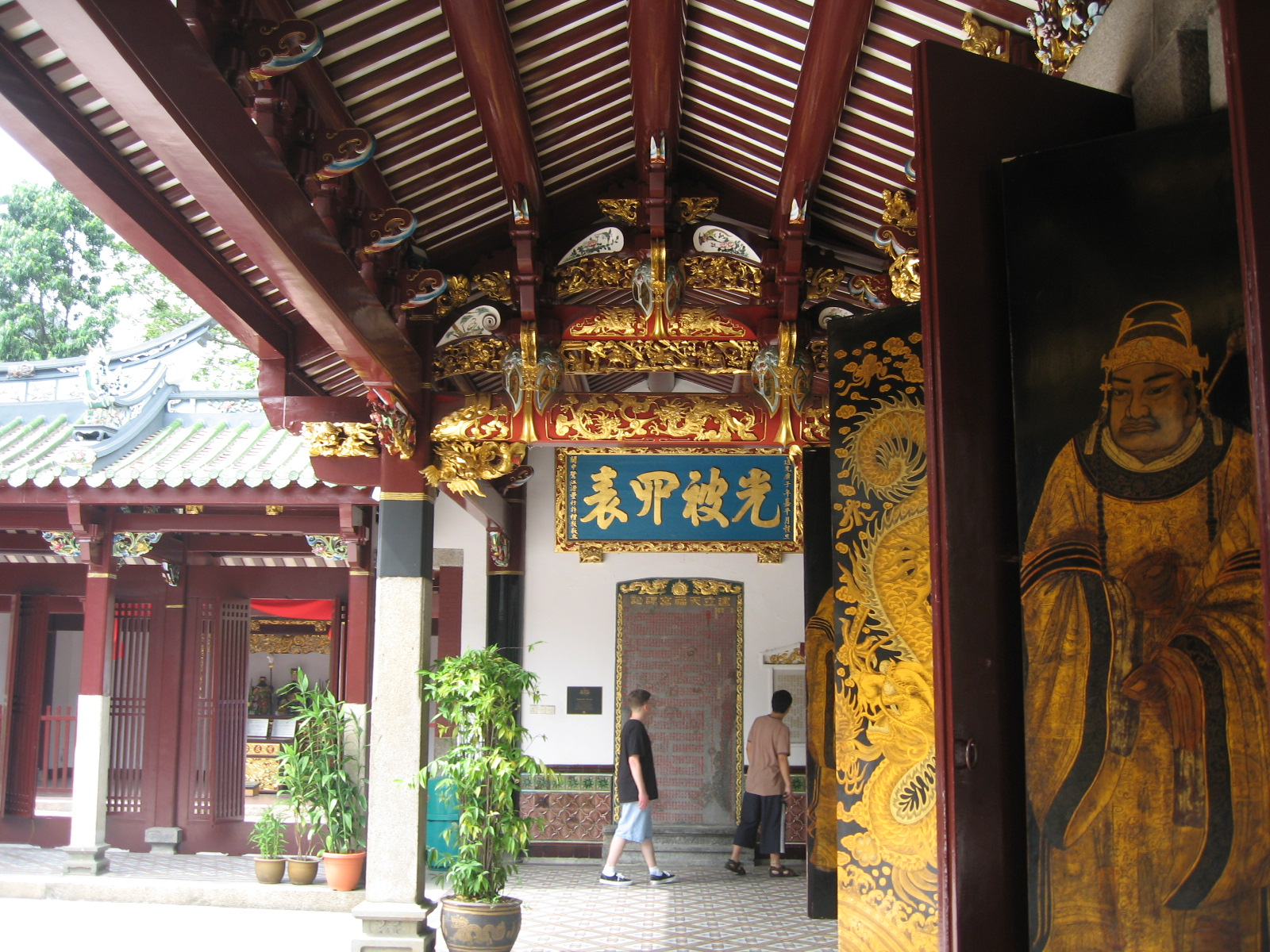
Entrance hall of the temple

The entrance hall has one main door and two side doors, with a high step in front. The side entrances are decorated with coloured tiles with peacocks, roses, and the Buddhist swastika motif that symbolises good luck, eternity and immortality. Guarding the doors are the traditional sentinels of Taoist temple – stone lions and Door Gods. The temple is richly decorated with coloured tiles, red, black and gold lacquered wood, as well as figures of dragons and phoenix, with embellished and gilded beams, brackets, and ceilings.

The entrance leads directly into main courtyard. Overlooking the courtyard is the temple proper where the shrine of Mazu is located. On either side of the temple are pagodas with octagonal base – the one on the left is a shrine of Confucius while the one on the right houses the ancestral tablets of Hokkien immigrants who founded the temple. Behind the main shrine is another courtyard where a smaller altar dedicated to Kuan Yin may be found. Down either side of the temple are aisles leading to the monks quarters.

== Worship ==
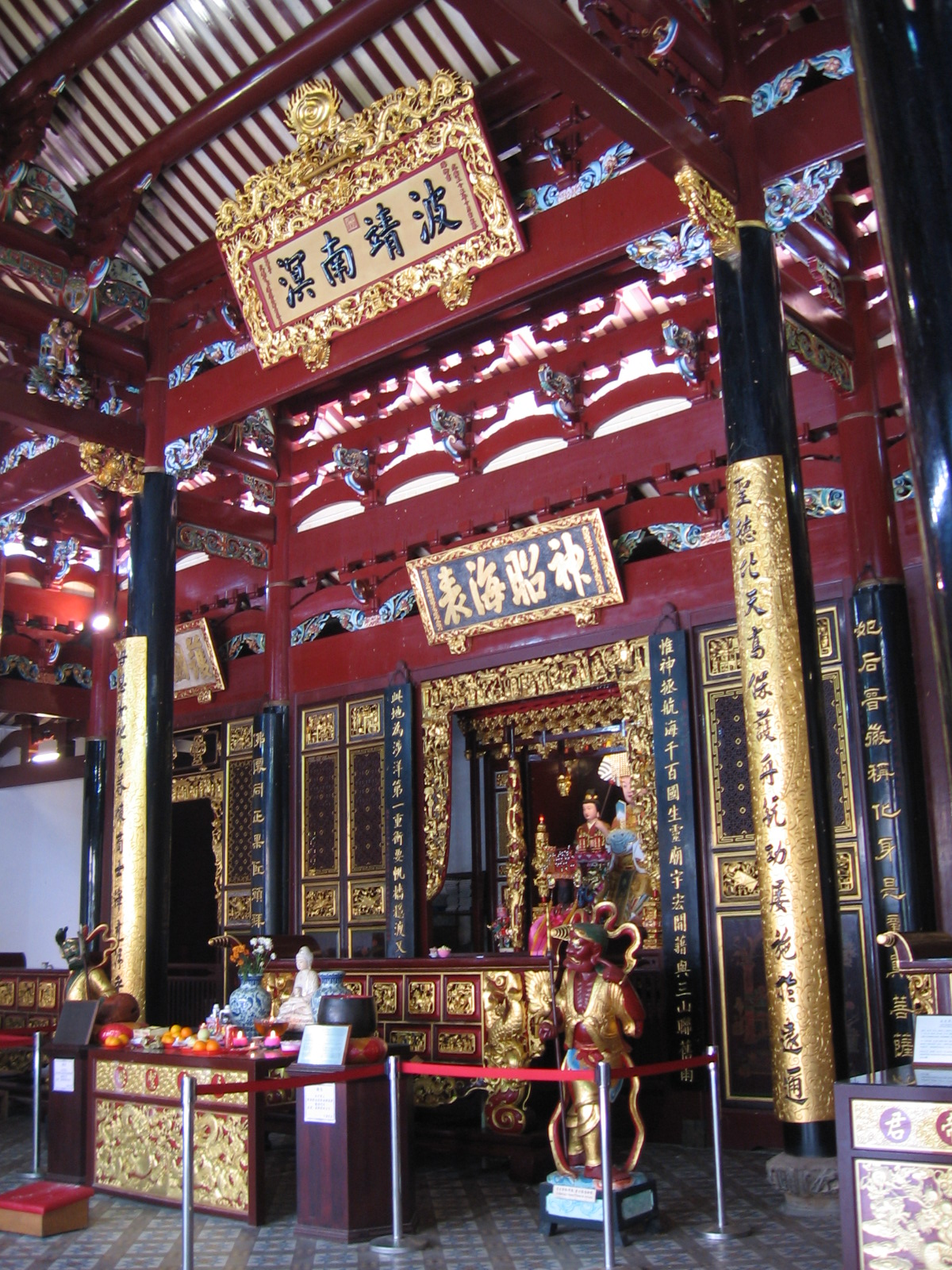
Altar to Mazu

The main deity worshiped in the temple is Mazu (媽祖婆, "Ma Cho Po" in the local dialect), a 10th-century Fujianese shamaness deified as a Chinese Sea Goddess. Early immigrants to Singapore offered incense to the Goddess to give thanks for a safe passage across the sea from China. Today's worshippers come to the temple to pray for peace, protection and good health.

A smaller shrine dedicated to Guanyin, the Goddess of Mercy, is located at the back. Other deities worshiped in the temple include the God of Medicine and Health (保生大帝, Baosheng Dadi), Holy Emperor Lord Guan (關聖帝君, Guan Sheng Dijun, worshipped for spiritual protection), the Sacred Duke Kai Zhang (開漳聖王, Kai Zhang Sheng Wang) and the City God (城隍爺, Cheng Huang Ye). Confucius is also venerated in the temple.

== News articles ==
- "Statue of Chinese sea goddess Mazu from Meizhou temple makes maiden voyage to Singapore". The Straits Times (online). 6 July 2017.
- "Where seafarers prayed for safe passage". The Straits Times (online). 14 September 2017.
