= Chubby Hubby =

Blogger in Singapore

Chubby Hubby or Aun Koh (born 1972) is a blogger from Singapore. His blog consists of dining reviews, travelling, wine and recipes for baking and cooking. It also consists of many photographs of the food, most being digitally altered. The blog earned reviews in the Guardian and was nominated for the world's best urban food blog in the 2005 Urban Blogging Awards.

== Education ==
Koh graduated from Columbia College of Columbia University in 1996.

== Career ==
Koh was mentioned in Prime Minister Lee Hsien Loong's National Day Rally speech in 2006, as an example of Singaporean blogs on the internet. Singapore newspaper The Straits Times has mentioned him several times in articles about the hottest blogs, blogs to watch and the most popular food blogs. He was interviewed by Newsweek and mentioned in The New York Times, the South China Morning Post and The Guardian.

Koh was invited to dine during the finale recording of Bravo Channels 8th Season's Top Chef competition 2010; which was held in Singapore; the shows first international finale location. Koh was not a judge but was a dinner guest.

In 2018, Koh and Wee Teng Wen, managing director of The Lo & Behold Group, opened a private club, Straits Clan, on the site of the former New Majestic hotel in Bukit Pasoh Road. In 2021, the club was fully acquired by the Mandala Group and renamed as the Mandala Club.

== Personal life ==
Koh's father is Tommy Koh, a Singaporean diplomat, lawyer, professor and author who served as Singapore's Permanent Representative to the United Nations.

Koh is married to Tan Su-Lyn, an editor and they have two children.
