= Ann Siang Hill =

Street in Singapore

- Interactive map of Ann Siang Hill
- Namesake: Chia Ann Siang
- Nearest metro station: Telok Ayer MRT station
- Coordinates: 1.2815963°N 103.8430031°E

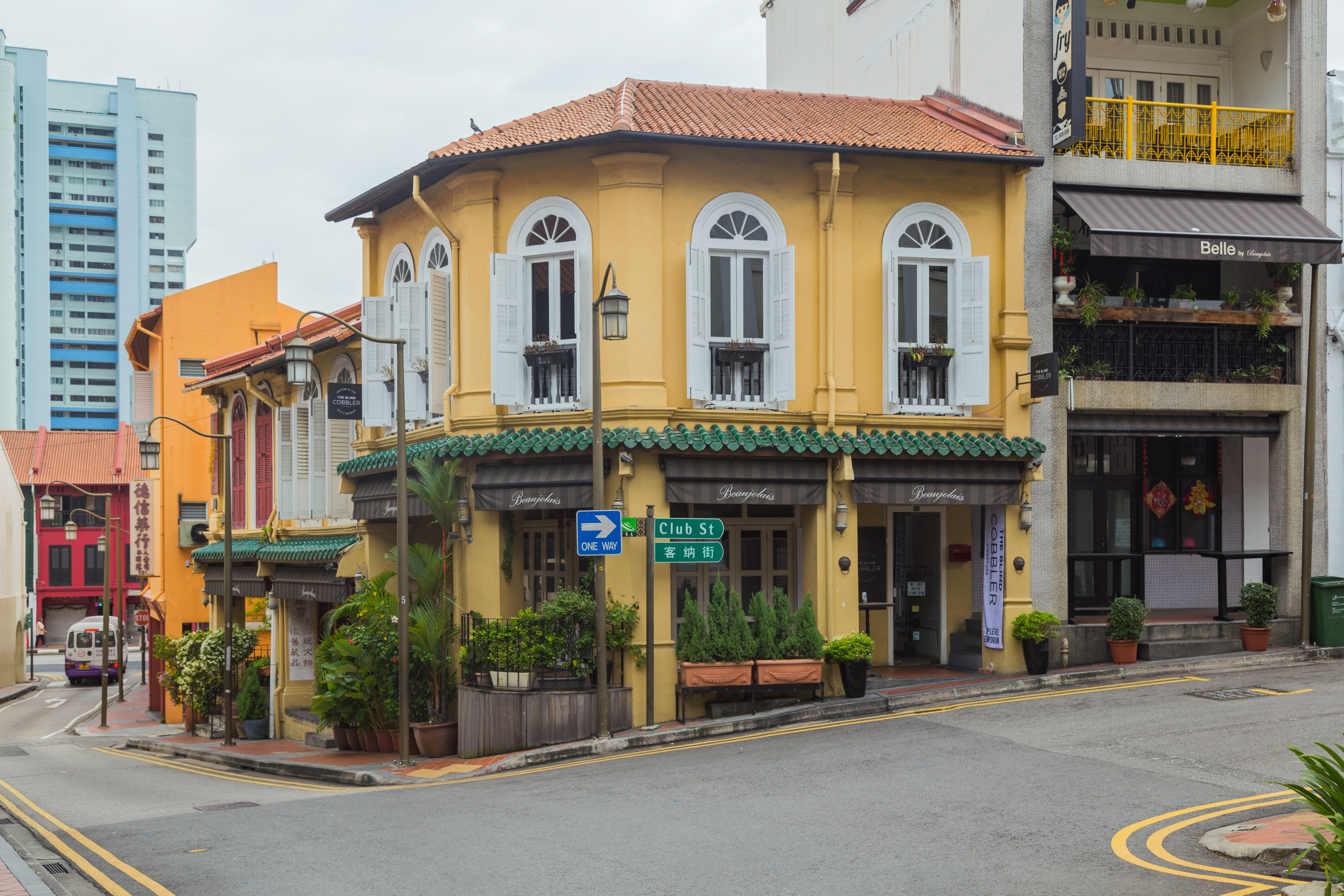
Ann Siang Hill towards Club Street

Ann Siang Hill (Chinese: 安祥山, Malay: Bukit Ann Siang) is a small hill, and the name of a one-way road located in Chinatown, Singapore. It was named after Chia Ann Siang, a wealthy businessman. The road links Club Street and Ann Siang Road (安祥路) to South Bridge Road.

Ann Siang Road connects Ann Siang Hill to Kadayanallur Street.

== Etymology and history ==
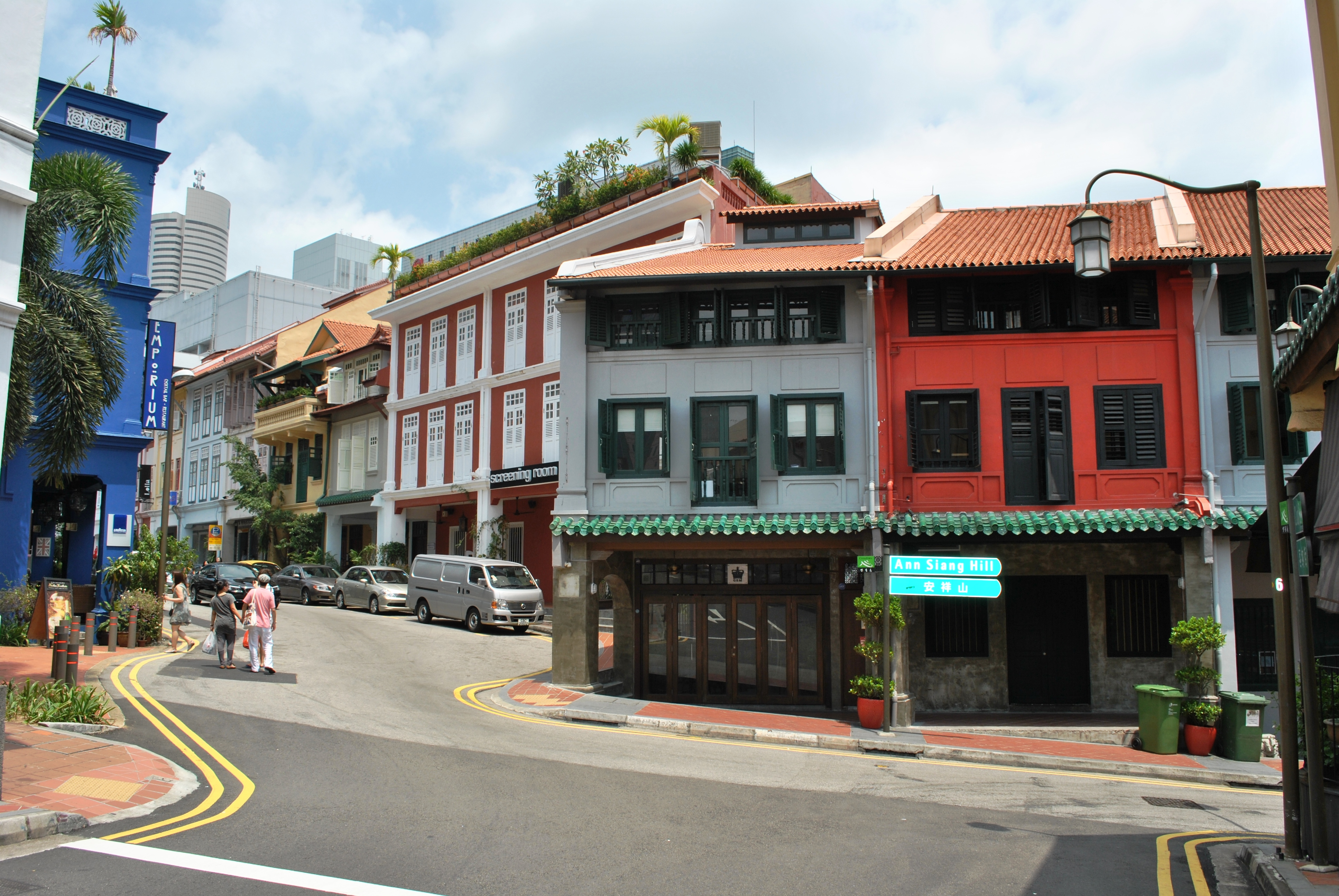
Ann Siang Hill from Club Street

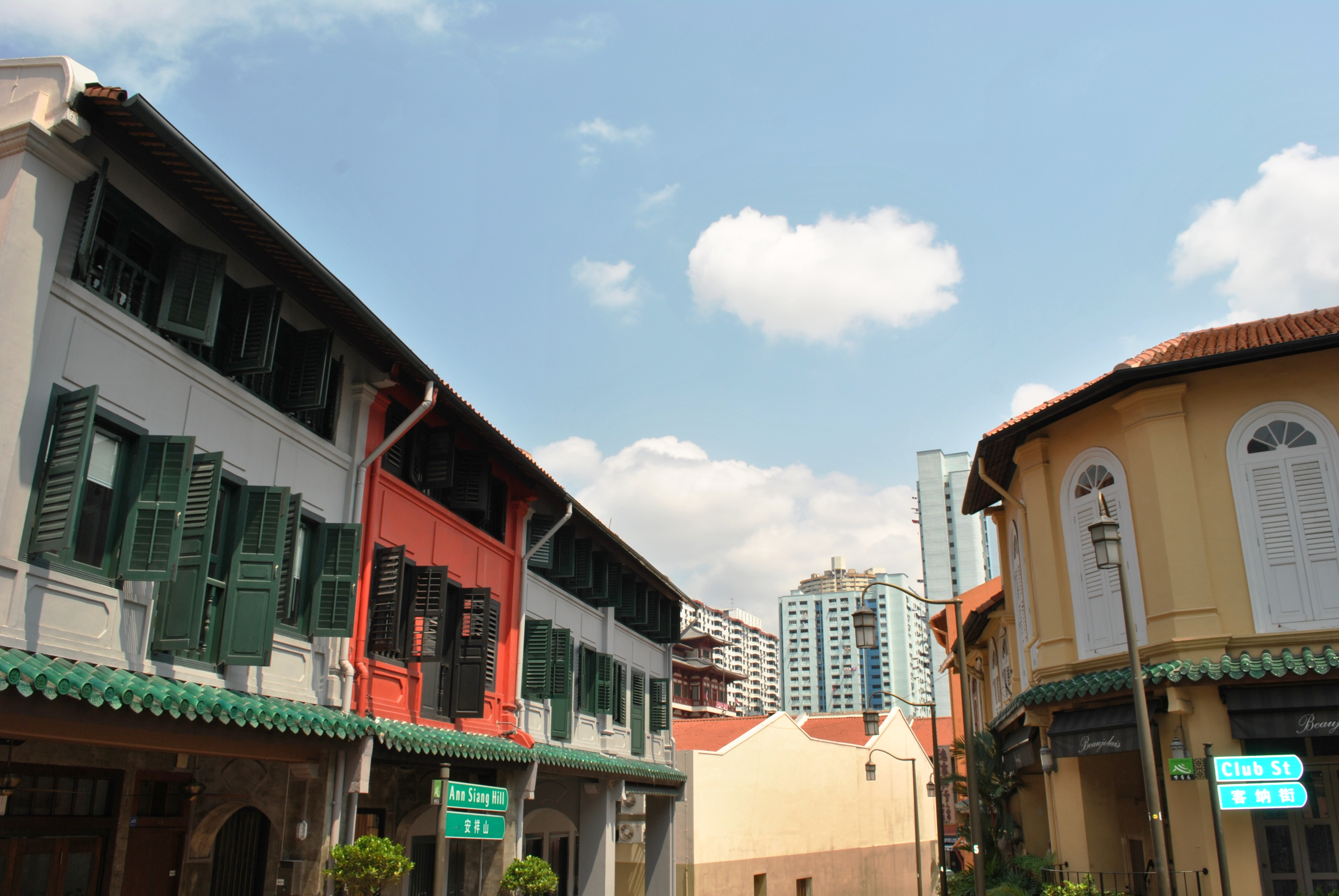
Ann Siang Hill, shophouses

Ann Siang Hill was originally known as Scott's Hill, after its original owner Charles Scott, who cultivated nutmegs and cloves in the area. It was later sold to John Gemmill, a merchant and former auctioneer, and was renamed as Gemmill's Hill. It was then sold to Chia in 1873 and renamed to Ann Siang Hill.

Chia joined the British firm Boustead and Company in 1848. The company traded in natural resources, spices, coconut, tobacco, tin, tea and silk. After eight years on the job, Chia was promoted to chief produce storekeeper. He retired in 1890 after over 40 years of service in the company, and went into the timber business. He also became a partner of the firm Geok Teat and Company in 1863. After he became a wealthy landowner and one of the leading merchants of his time, he acquired both Gemmill's Hill and Mount Erskine.

The hill was known as qing shan ting to the local Chinese. The early Chinese immigrants visited Ann Siang Hill when they wanted to send money home to their families in China, as it was the traditional site of remittance houses. Letter writers and calligraphers also had their businesses at the five-foot way of the shophouses to help the illiterate immigrants write letters home.

Most of the houses in Ann Siang Hill and along Ann Siang Road were built between 1903 and 1941. Ann Siang Road, which has elegantly restored shophouses today, was once the traditional home of clan associations and exclusive social clubs.

== See also ==
- Damenlou Hotel
