= Damenlou Hotel =

Building in Ann Siang Road, Singapore

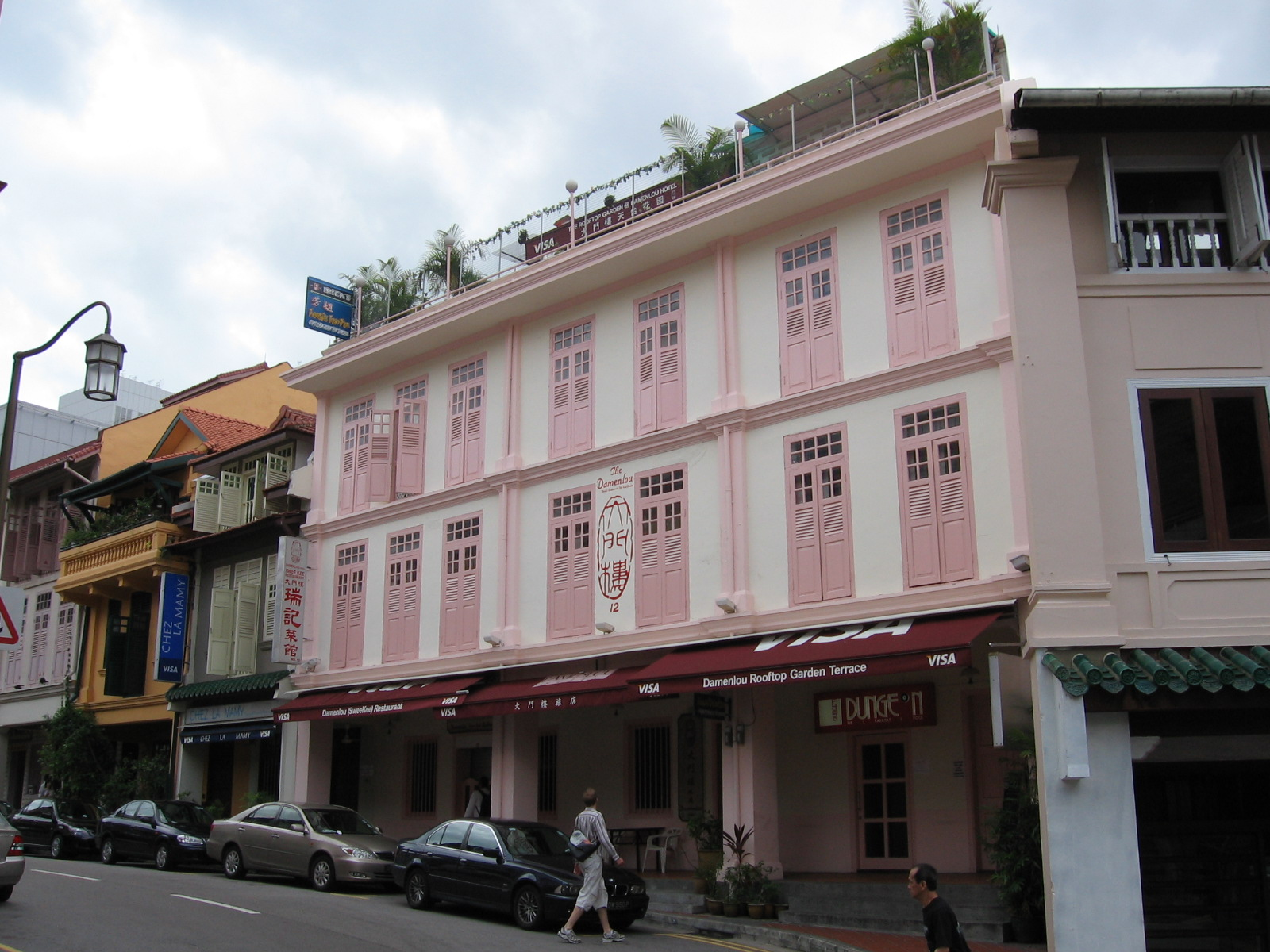

- Location within Singapore

General information
- Location: Ann Siang Road, Chinatown, Central Area, Singapore
- Coordinates: 1°16′52.6″N 103°50′50″E

Damenlou Hotel (Chinese: 大门楼旅店) was a small hotel located at Ann Siang Road, in Chinatown, within the Central Area of Singapore.

Damenlou Hotel's origins can be traced to the creation of the dish of fish head mifen (rice vermicelli), which was invented by Tang Kwong Swee in the 1920s. The hotel had a famous restaurant, named Swee Kee.

By mid-2007, Damenlou Hotel had ceased operations. Its premises have been taken over by the Screening Room, a dining and entertainment venue with bistro, movie theatre and rooftop bar. Accompanying this change, the hotel facade and interior have been heavily renovated.
