= The Scarlet Singapore =

Boutique hotel in Chinatown, Singapore

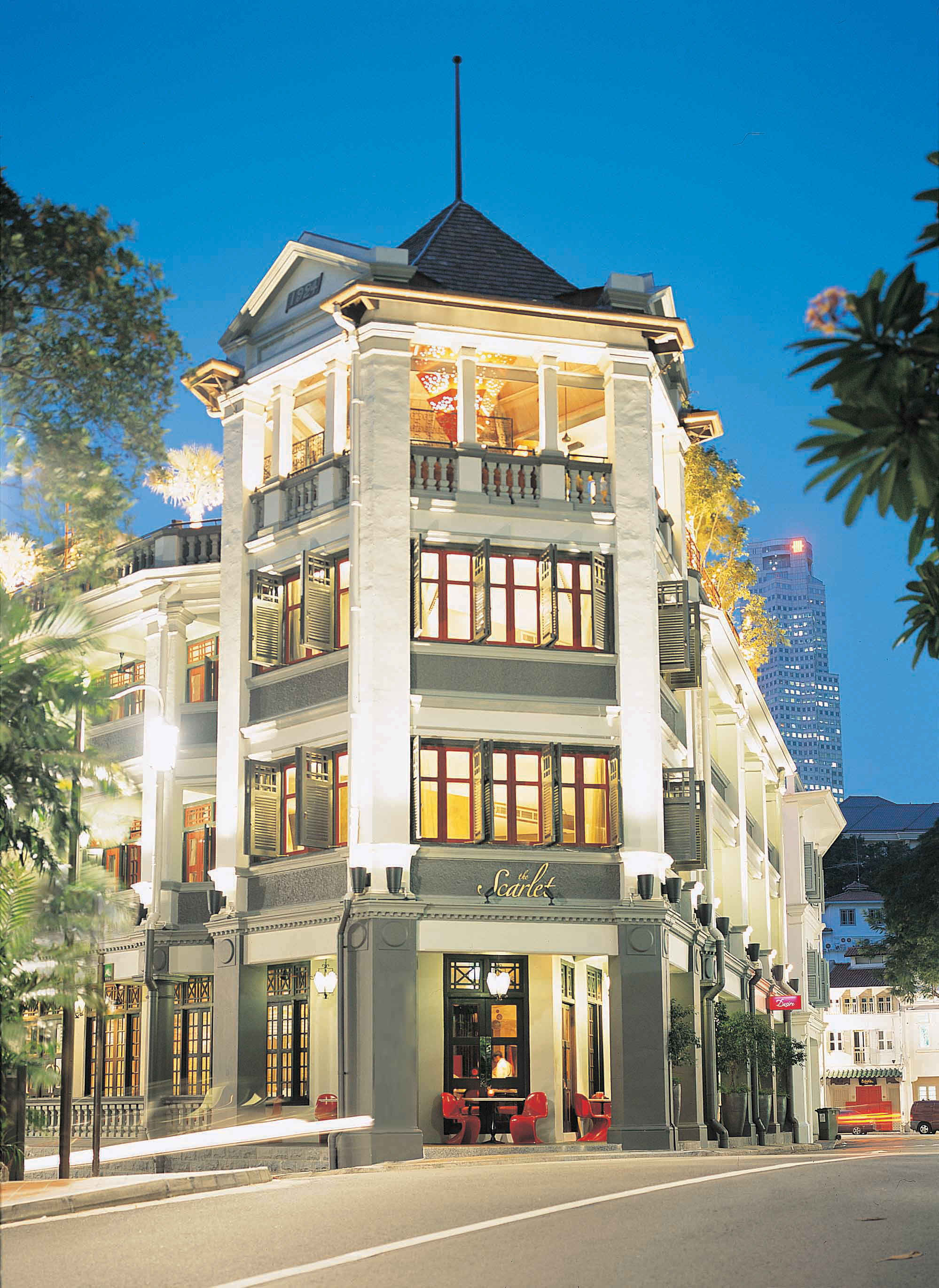
- The Scarlet Singapore

- Location within Singapore

General information
- Location: 33 Erskine Road Singapore 069333
- Coordinates: 1°16′50.3″N 103°50′43.3″E
- Opening: 2004
- Owner: Grace International

Design and construction
- Architects: HK Hia & Associates

Other information
- Number of rooms: 80
- Number of suites: 5

Website
- https://www.thescarletsingapore.com/

The Scarlet Singapore is a luxury boutique hotel located at Erskine Road, Chinatown, Singapore. Opened in 2004, The Scarlet Singapore contains 80 rooms and is managed by Singapore-based hospitality management group Grace International.

== History ==
The Scarlet Singapore was opened in 2004, comprising 13 Early Shophouses built in 1868 and a 1924 Art Deco building. The hotel incorporates No 9 to 37 Erskine Road which includes a four-storey concrete building which was constructed in 1942 and fourteen two storey 'shophouses'. The shophouses were built in 1868 and were the homes of Chinese immigrants until the 1980s when the first storey was used for retail. The shophouses were bought in 1988 to make a boutique hotel (The Inn of Sixth Happiness). This closed down and was bought by Grace International in 1997.

Grace International bought and renovated the site, spending 45 million SGD in 1997. It reopened in 2004.

The Scarlet Singapore is the proud recipient of the Singapore Architectural Heritage Award 2005 for preserving the older buildings. It was further awarded 'Leading Boutique Hotel' by World Travel Awards 2018, 2017, 2015, and 2014. It was renovated in 2013 and then in May 2014 the sister hotel, The Scarlet Huntington Hotel, in San Francisco was opened.

In March 2016, The Scarlet Hotel took part in the Earth Hour movement by dimming down its lights, reducing AC usage, and asking guests to follow through in their rooms.

== Description ==
The 80-room hotel is managed by Singapore-based hospitality management group, Grace International.

The exterior was restored to its original state while the interior was completely restructured. The decor is predominantly gold, bronze and crimson, and includes rose-patterned furniture, chandeliers, and gilded mirrors.

The hotel has two restaurants, a bar and fitness centre.
