= Sloane Court Hotel =

Defunct hotel at Balmoral Road, Singapore

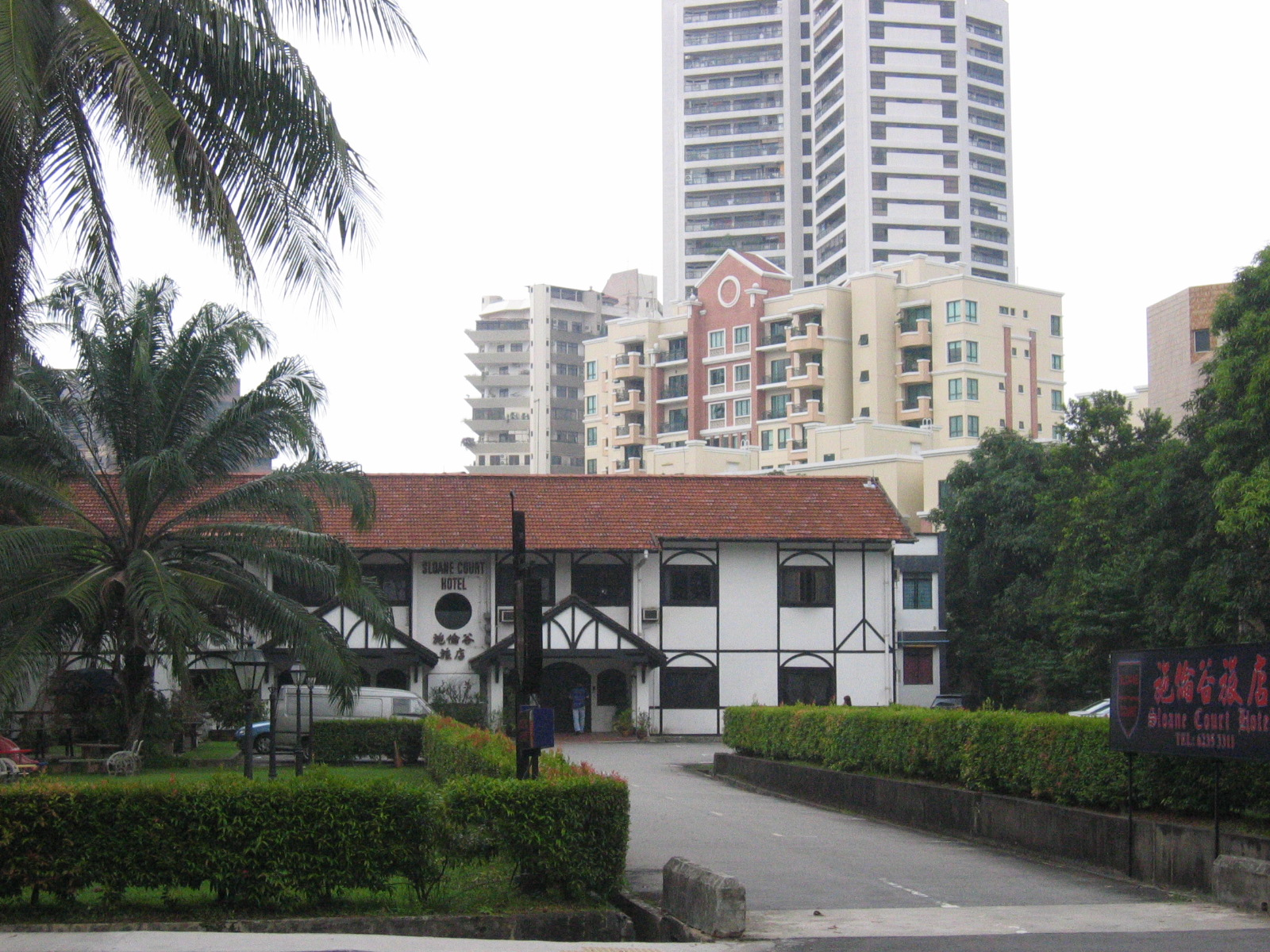
The hotel in 2006

Sloane Court Hotel was a hotel located along Balmoral Road in Singapore. Opened as a boarding house in 1962, it initially catered to British soldiers in Singapore. It was closed in late 2017 and demolished shortly after.

== History ==
The building was initially established as a 26-room boarding house in 1962, catering to British soldiers stationed in Singapore. However, when the British military withdrew their forces in Singapore by 1971, the hotel instead began targeting Japanese engineers and industrialists, then Thai and Indonesian businessman. By the late 1970s, the Chiam family, the hotel's owners, decided to give the hotel a facelift. The newly renovated building had a Tudor-style façade, based on a suggestion by restaurateur Stanley Foster, who also gave the hotel its name. By the late 1980s, the Chiams began to plan for a $250,000 renovation which would inrtoduce the Tudor-style theming into the hotel's interior as well. By then, the hotel's capacity had grown to 32 rooms. The hotel also housed the Berkely, a 16th-century themed restaurant and pub. A food critic from The Straits Times wrote a positive review of the restaurant in August 1982, giving it a rating of 7 out of 10. The hotel's interior featured lace curtains, framed tapestry works depicting the English countryside and a mock fireplace.

In August 2017, it was announced that the hotel had been sold to TSky Development, who planned to redevelop it and an adjoining site into a condominium, for $80.5 million. The Berkeley closed on 29 October and the hotel itself closed on November 28, and was demolished in the following year.
