= Fuk Tak Chi Temple =

Museum and former temple in Singapore

Coordinates: 1°16′59″N 103°50′55″E

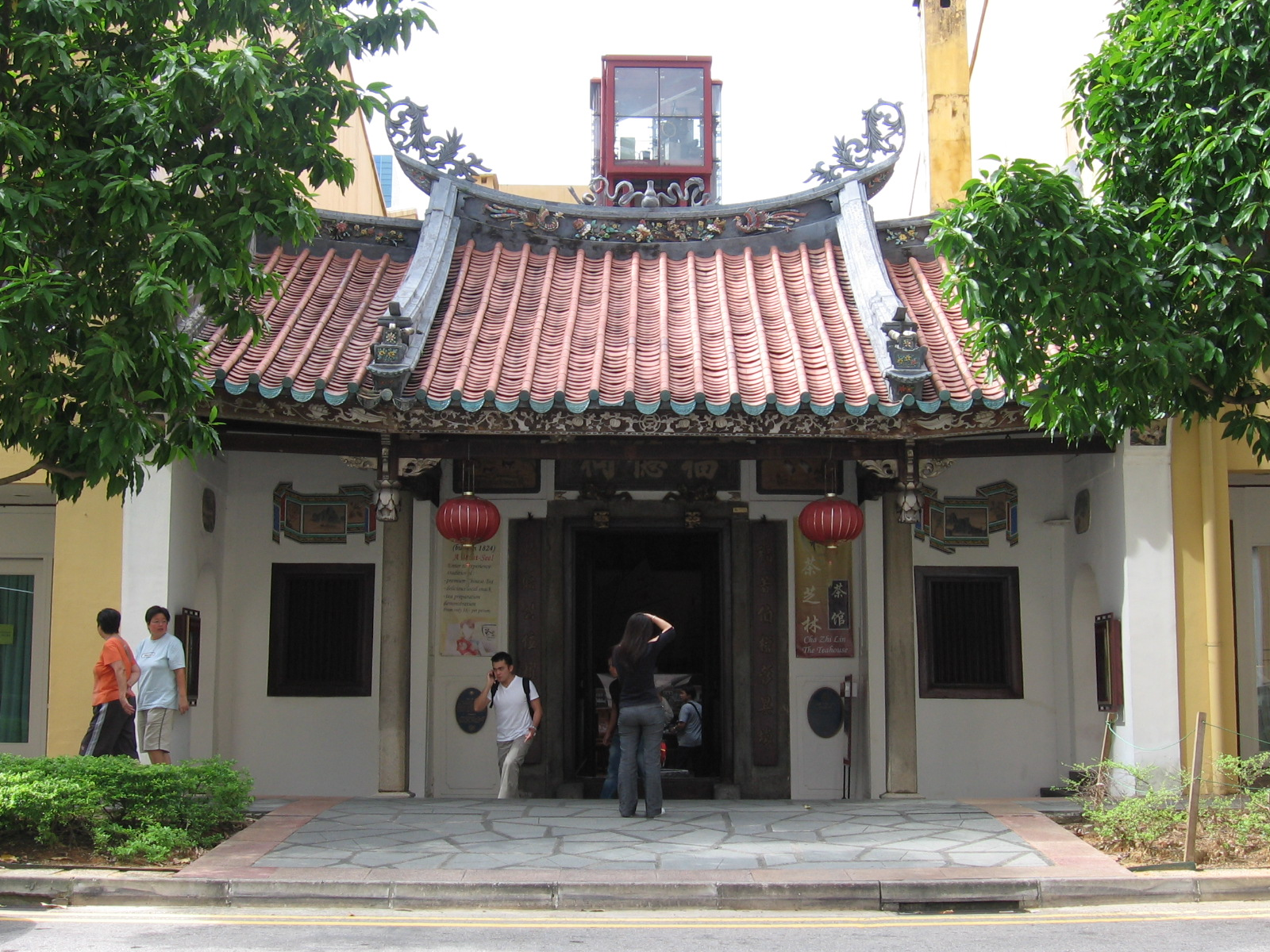
Fuk Tak Chi Museum

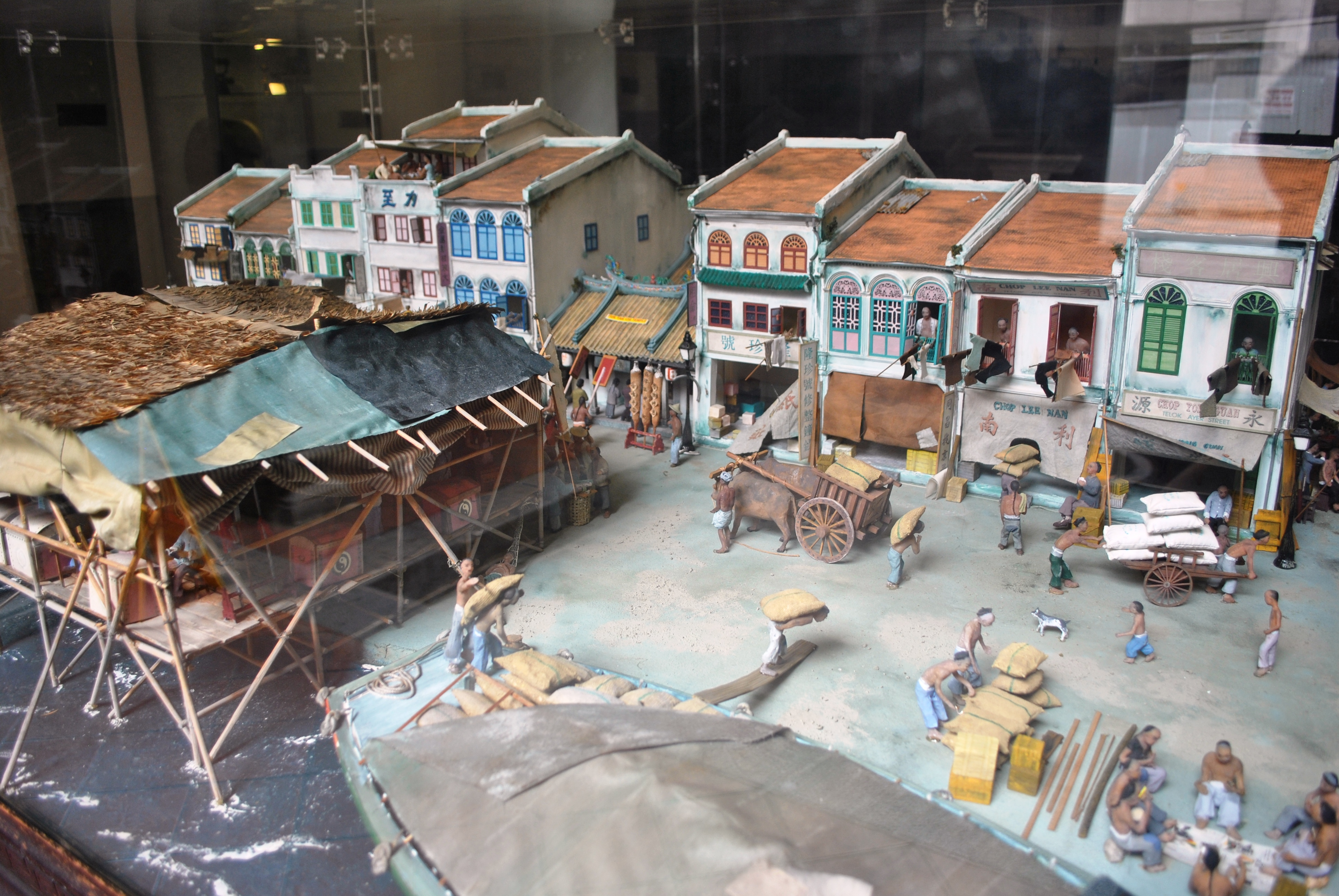
Fuk Tak Chi Temple, museum

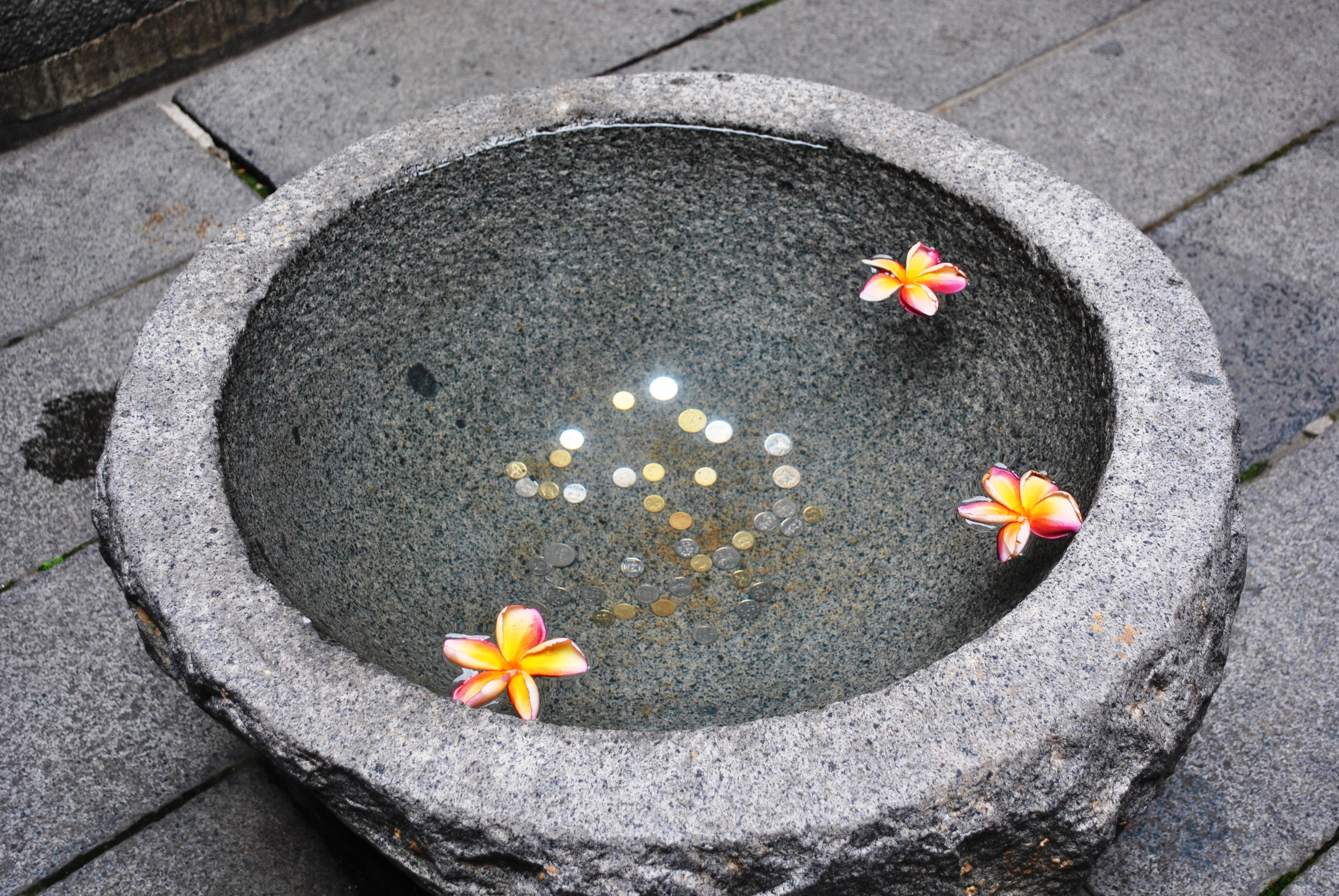
Fuk Tak Chi Temple, shrine

The Fuk Tak Chi Temple or Fook Tet Soo Khek Temple (Chinese: 海唇福德祠) was one of the oldest former temple in Singapore built in 1820 by Cantonese and Hakka immigrants. Evidence from an 1824 plaque indicates that the site was already in use as an early Tua Pek Kong shrine by that date. from Kwong Wai Siew (广惠肇三府). It is currently a museum housing about 200 artefacts and reopened on 19 November 1998 as Fuk Tak Chi Museum, described by the National Library Board as Singapore's first street museum.

== History ==
The temple was built in 1820 by Cantonese and Hakka immigrants to Singapore. Between 1820 and 1824, Cantonese and Hakka immigrants had already installed a shrine to Tua Pek Kong at the temple's current site. The shrine was one of the first places newly arrived immigrants from China visited to offer thanks for their safe passage to Singapore. It was initially housed in a simple non-concrete structure. A plaque from the fourth year of the Daoguang Emperor's reign, dated 1824, has been cited as evidence that the site was already in use by that year. The plaque bears the inscription "Zepi haidao", glossed as "benefitting the island", and has been described as the earliest known artefact of the Chinese community in Singapore. In 1825, it was rebuilt using bricks.

The temple was supported by Cantonese and Hakka communities including Kwong Wai Siew, Fong Yun Thai and Kar Yeng Five Districts. Besides its religious functions, it oversaw the construction of the Cheng San Teng and Loke Yah Teng cemeteries and also served as an association for the Chinese community. Surviving inscriptions record renovations or expansions in 1854, 1862 and 1869. Dedicated to Tua Pek Kong, it is a Chinese folk religion temple which caters to the religious needs of both Chinese folk religionists and Taoists.

It was a place where the Cantonese and Hakka communities forged their alliance. One of the temple's later renovations, in 1869, was financed by Cheang Hong Lim. An inscription dated 1870 further records that a walled platform was built in front of the sea-facing temple for performances offered to the deities.

A dispute over the distribution of temple funds was recorded in 1886 and involved both the Inspector-General and the Protector of the Chinese. After the case was heard, representatives of the Cantonese and Hakka communities were ordered to sign a contract on 2 January 1887, under which the two communities alternated in appointing a temple keeper. The government requisitioned the temple in 1985. When the temple was officially closed in 1994, Taoist priests performed rituals for the permanent removal of its statues. Only the images of Tua Pek Kong and Cheng Huang Ye were relocated to the Hok Tek Chi Loke Yah Teng Association in Geylang. In 1995, the temple was awarded to Far East Organization, alongside Chui Eng Free School and other shophouses, by the Urban Redevelopment Authority for conservation and reuse purposes. The restored building reopened on 19 November 1998 as Fuk Tak Chi Museum.

In August 1998, the building was restored and converted into a museum with artefacts on the lives of early Chinese migrants in Singapore. As a conservation project, the original features of the building have been retained. The temple occupies about 2,500 sq ft. Built on the shoreline, it initially faced the sea. After land reclamation, several buildings now separate the shoreline and the temple. In 2000, it became part of the new Far East Square development.

In October 2014, the temple closed for renovation for 10 months and reopened in August 2015. Amoy Hotel's entrance is located through the temple as well.

== See also ==
- Religion in Singapore
