= New Majestic Hotel =

Hotel in Bukit Pasoh Road, Singapore

Coordinates: 1°16′45.4″N 103°50′25.5″E

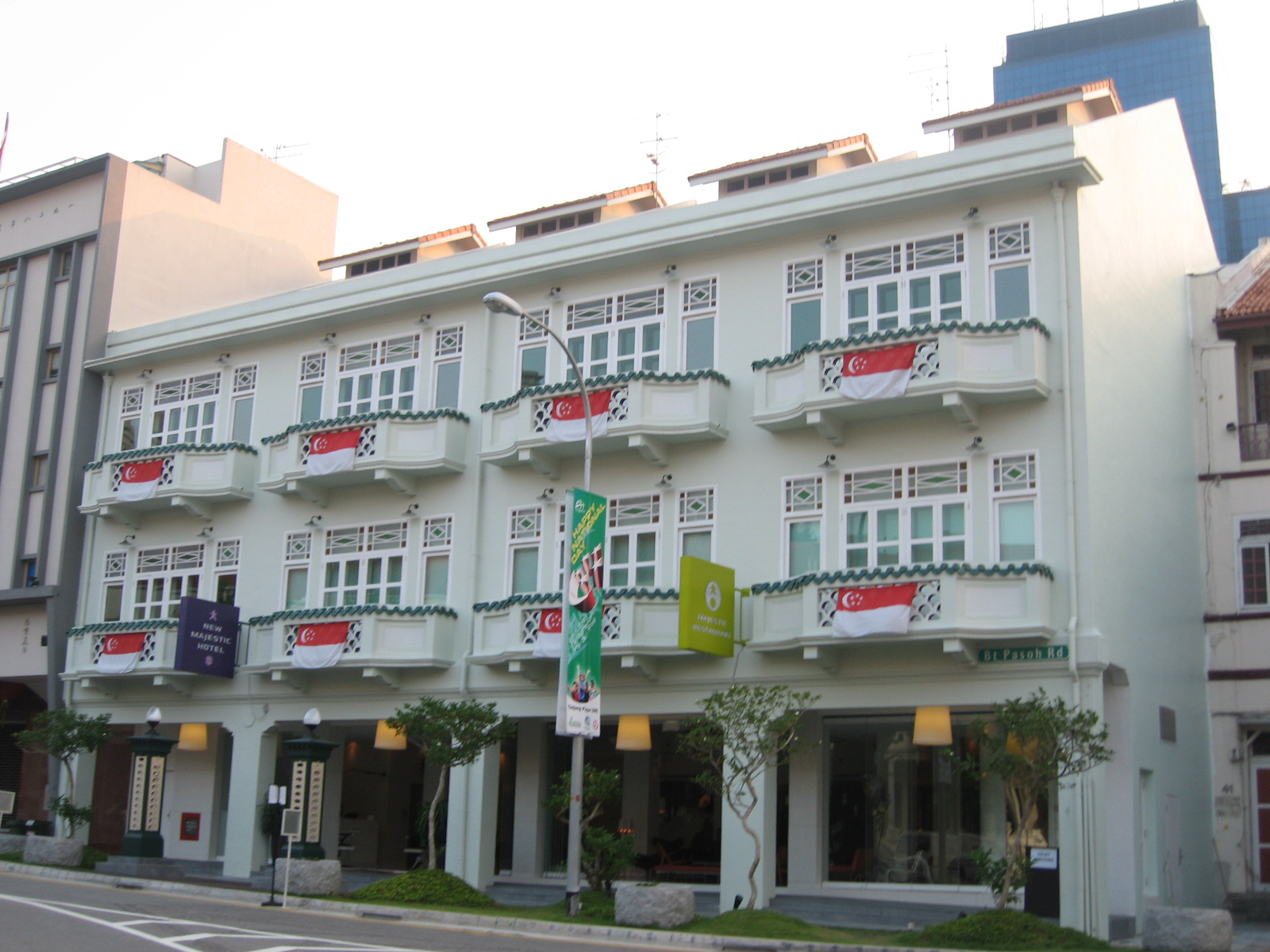
The New Majestic Hotel (extreme right) was a boutique hotel in Singapore's Bukit Pasoh Road

The New Majestic Hotel, on Bukit Pasoh Road in Singapore's Chinatown was a hotel opened in 2006. The building originally consisted of four shophouses and a restaurant. It was a boutique hotel under The Unlisted Collection owned by Loh Lik Peng. It was closed on 1 June 2017.

== History ==
The Majestic hotel, comprising four shophouses and a restaurant, was built in 1928.

In 2003, Loh Lik Peng of KMC Holdings bought the hotel and restored the exterior to its original state. The lobby ceiling was stripped to reveal the previous paintwork. While the hotel was restored, it was redesigned also by Ministry of Design, a design agency with the agency designing the architecture of the hotel and rooms' interiors. Furnishings include old dentist's chairs and theatre seats, as well as more modern items.

In 2006, it was reopened as a boutique hotel, New Majestic Hotel.

In March 2017, it was announced that the hotel will close on 1 June. It was later revealed that the hotel will be converted to a private member club Straits Clan owned by Aun Koh and Wee Teng Wen, managing director of The Lo & Behold Group.

== Awards ==
- 2006 Architectural Heritage award
