= Sago Street =

Street in Chinatown, Singapore

Coordinates: 1°16′53.8″N 103°50′39.7″E

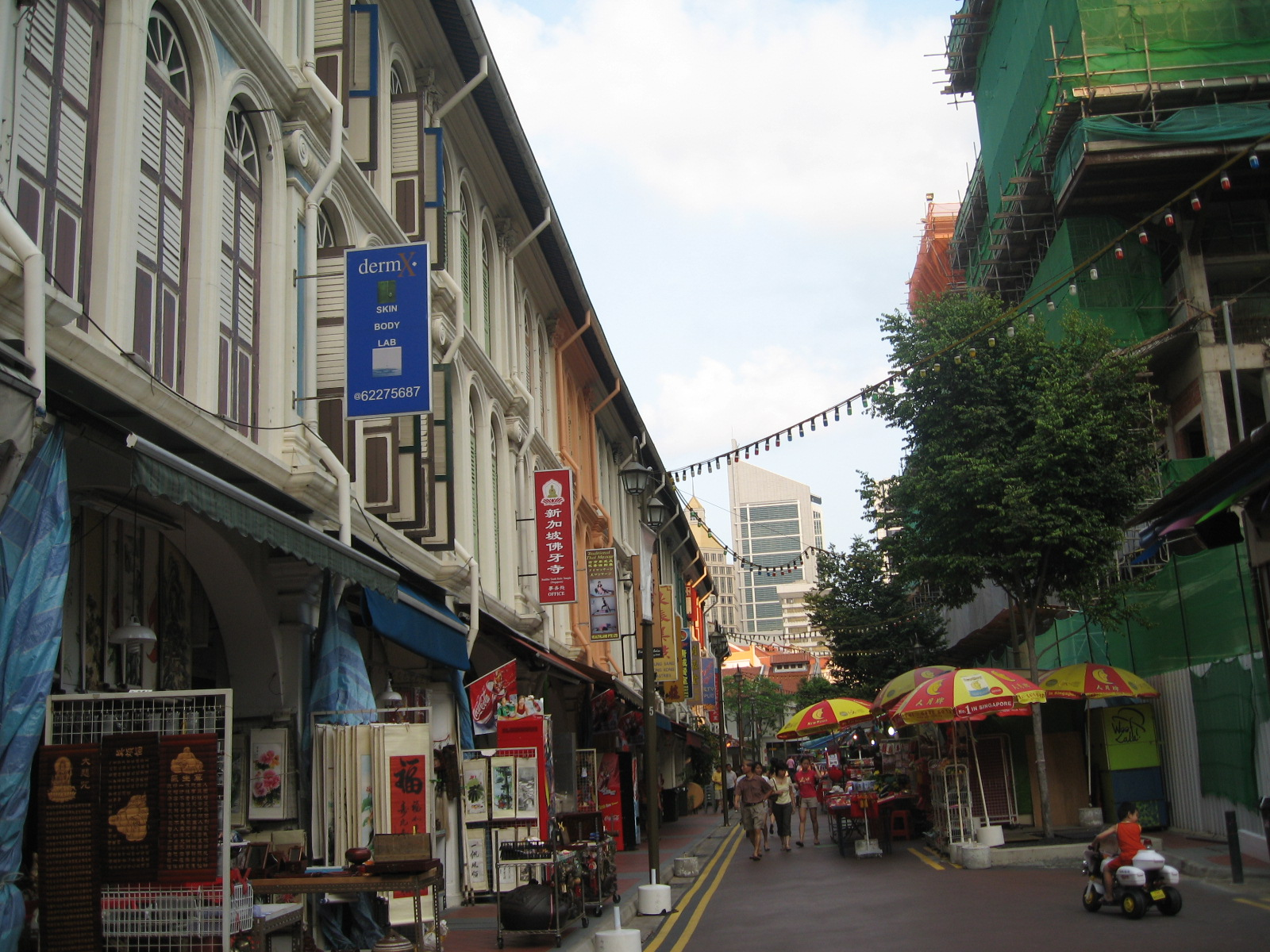
Sago Street in Chinatown, Singapore.

Sago Street (traditional Chinese: 碩莪街; simplified Chinese: 硕莪街) is a street located in Chinatown within the Outram Planning Area of Singapore. There is a Trengganu Street that links Sago Street to Smith Street, Temple Street and Pagoda Street. Half of the Sago Street was converted into a pedestrian mall in 2003. It now serves mainly as a tourist attraction that houses food outlets, bars, retail shops and offices, with the streets lined up with pushcarts selling a range of souvenirs and street snacks. It is also Singapore's largest historic district, with rents costing upwards of S$3.80 psf.

== Etymology and history ==
The funeral parlours are located on nearby Sago Lane and not Sago Street. As such, Sago Lane has always being referred to as sei yang gai or "street of the dead" in Cantonese. However, there are no cemeteries in Sago Lane. During the years 1950 to 2000, the entire Sago Street and Trengganu Street were occupied by wet, dry markets and cooked food hawkers.
