= Temple Street, Singapore =

Street in Singapore

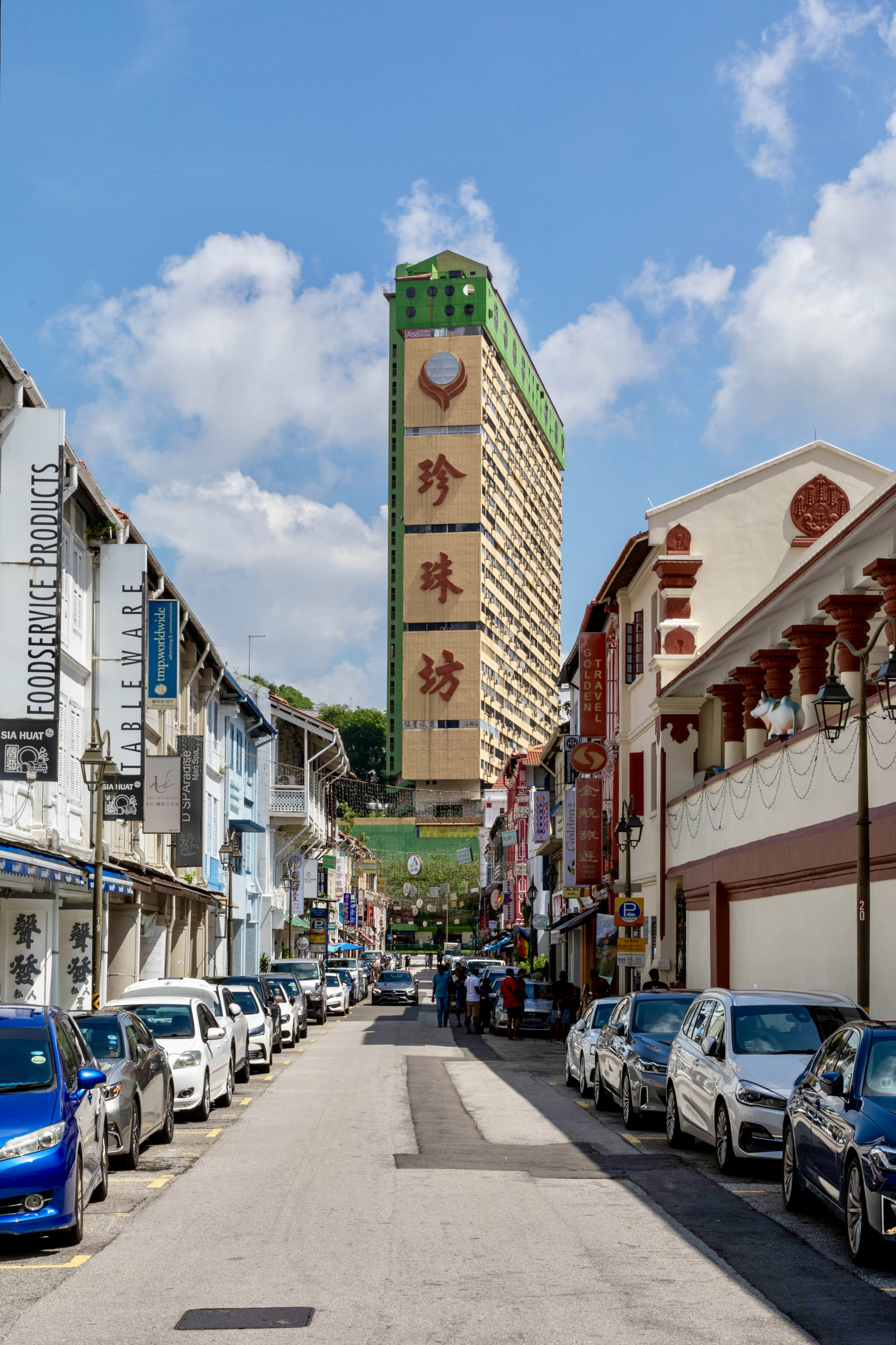
Temple Street from the intersection with South Bridge Road to North West. People's Park Complex at the end of the street.

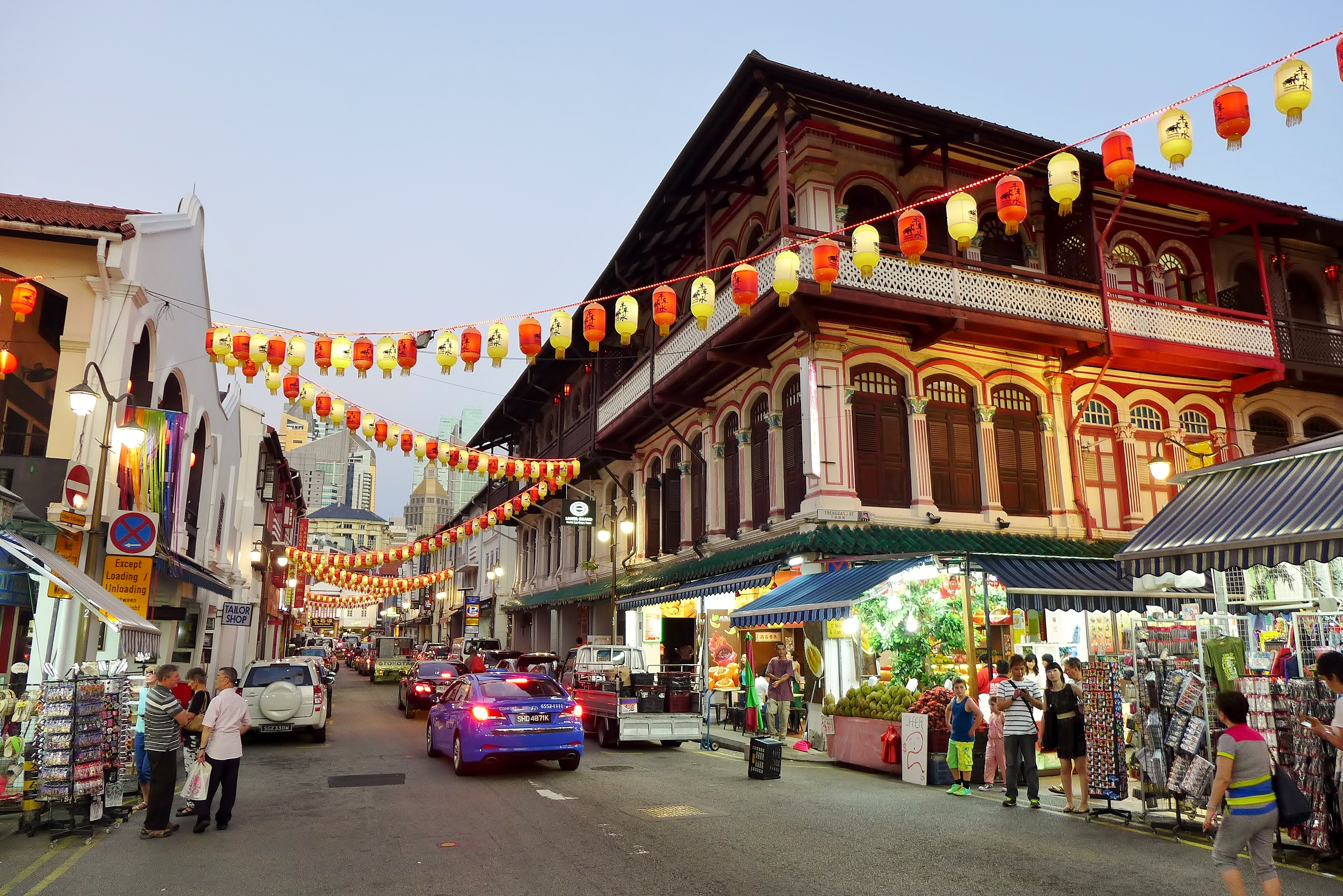
Temple Street, Chinatown, Singapore

Temple Street (Chinese: 登婆街; Malay: Lebuh Kuil) is a one-way street in Chinatown within the Outram Planning Area in Singapore. The road links South Bridge Road to New Bridge Road, and is intersected by Trengganu Street.

== Etymology and history ==
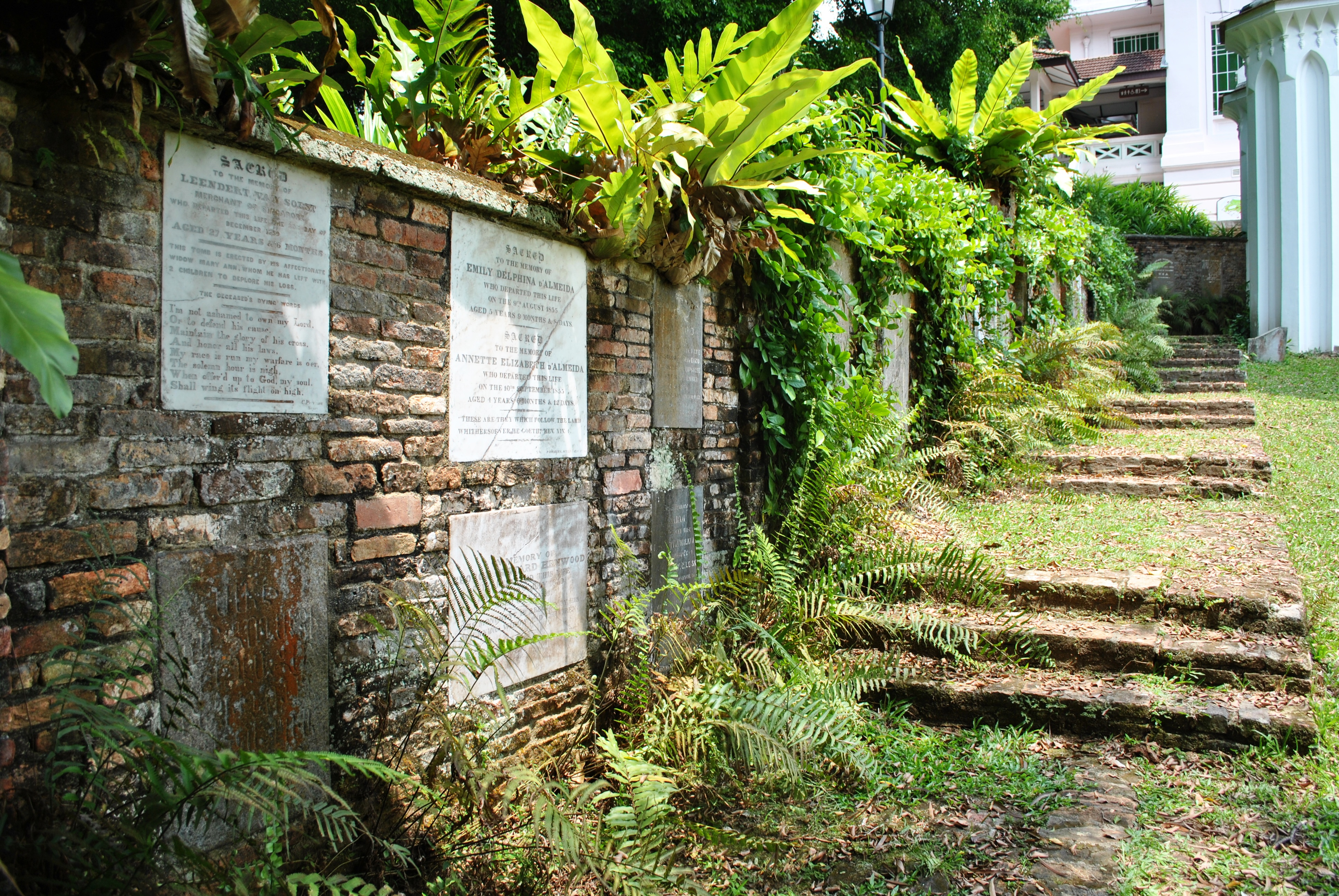
José d'Almeida's tomb at Fort Canning Old Cemetery

The official name for Temple Street was formerly Almeida Street after Joaqium d'Almeida, son of José d'Almeida, who owned some land in this area at the junction of Temple Street and Trengganu Street. In 1825, José d'Almeida, a Portuguese physician and trader, opened a clinic and a shop here and made his fortune by trading in Portuguese and Chinese goods.

In 1908, the Municipal Commissioners changed its name to Temple Street to avoid confusion with other streets in Singapore that were also named after D'Almeida.

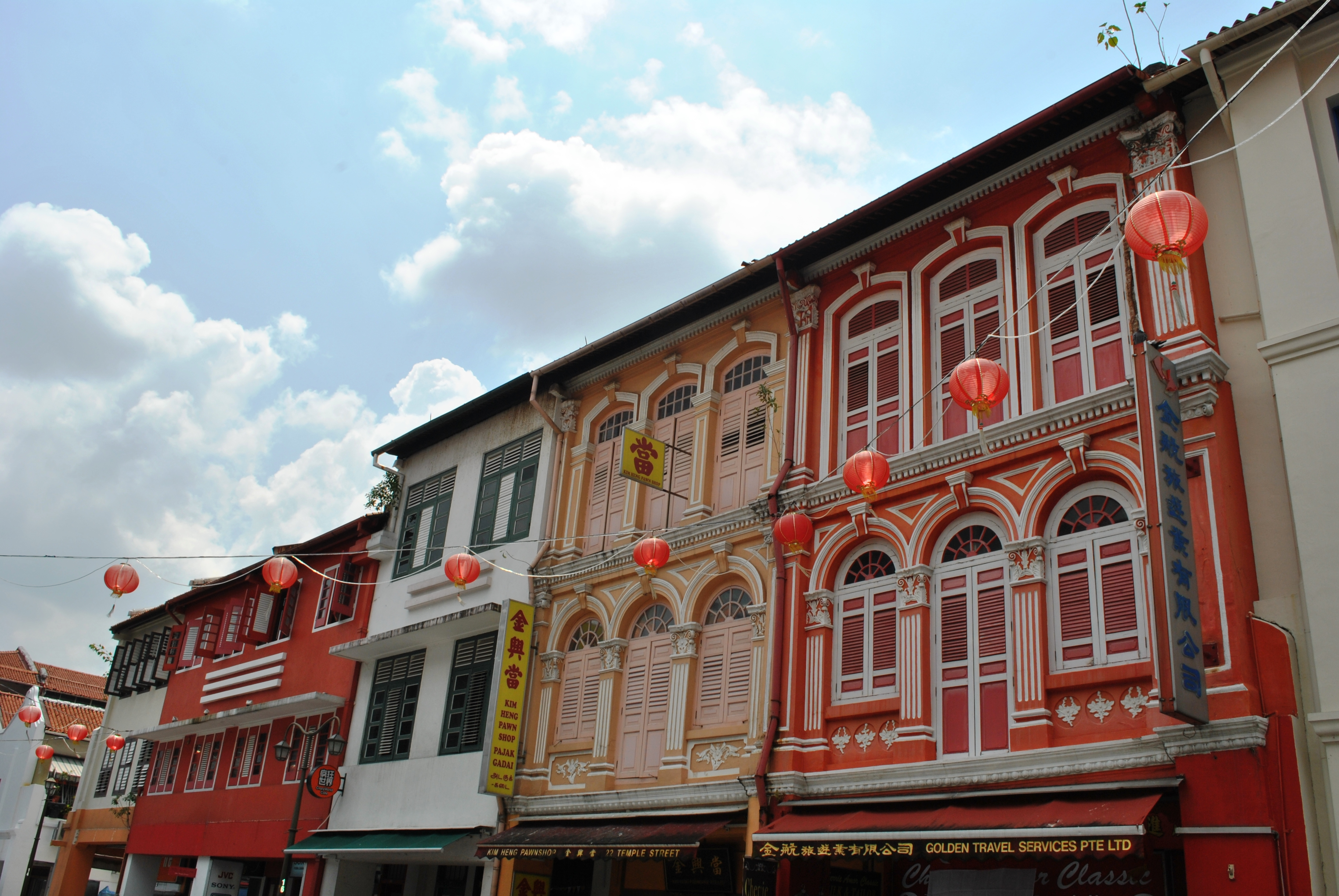
Temple Street, Singapore, shophouses

The street name Temple refers to the Sri Mariamman Temple, the oldest Hindu temple in Singapore, which is located at the South Bridge Road end of the street. It was established in 1827 by Narayana Pillay, who came from Penang in the company of Stamford Raffles during the latter's second visit to Singapore in May 1819. Pillay's original business was destroyed by fire but with help from Raffles, he was soon back to his feet and moved to Commercial Square (now Raffles Place). As an act of piety and gratitude, Pillay built the temple using wood and attap. This structure was replaced by one of brick and plaster in 1843 and has been repaired and renovated several times since then.

The Chinese name for this street, hei yuen hau jie or "theatre back street", refers to the Lai Chun Yuen Opera House located at Smith Street, a major landmark from the 1880s up to World War II in Chinatown until it was damaged by a bomb during the war. Cantonese operas were popular here until 1927 and converted as Sun Seng Cinema by Shaw Brothers and now as Santa Grand Hotel.

Temple Street was home to many Teochew traders who sold Chinaware and household items. There were also itinerant tinsmiths and metalware workshops as well as blacksmiths making horseshoes.

== See also ==
- Temple Street, Hong Kong
