= Trengganu Street =

Street in Chinatown, Singapore

Coordinates: 1.28287°N 103.84419°E

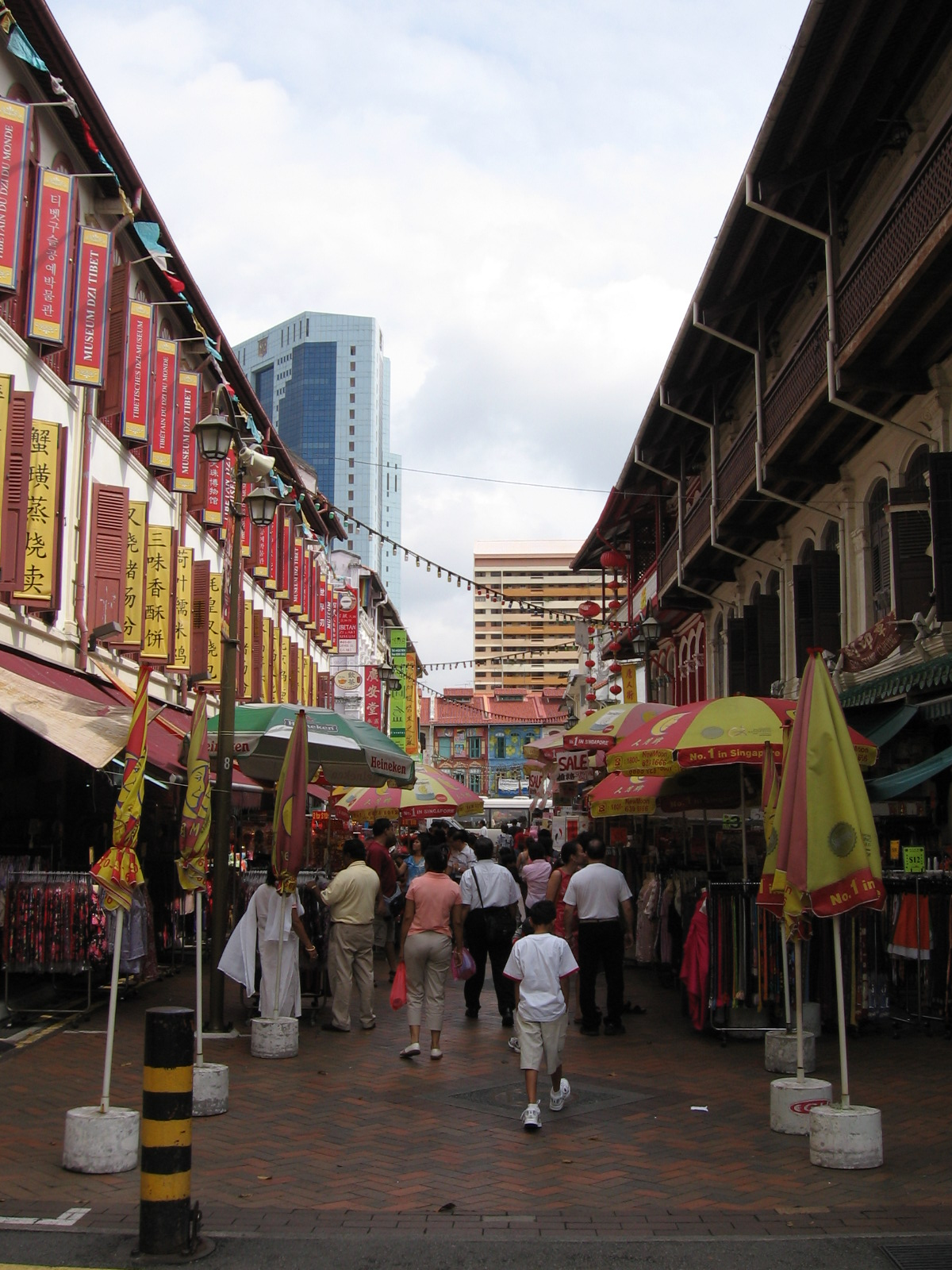
- Trengganu Street, Chinatown, Singapore
- Traditional Chinese: 1. 牛車水橫街; 2. 戲院橫街; 3. 丁加奴街
- Simplified Chinese: 1. 牛车水横街; 2. 戏院横街; 3. 丁加奴街
- Literal meaning: 1. Kreta Ayer's cross street 2. theatre side street 3. (Phonetic transcription)
Transcriptions
Standard Mandarin
- Hanyu Pinyin: 1. niú chē shuǐ héng jiē 2. xì yuàn héng jiē 3. Dīngjiānú Jiē
Yue: Cantonese
- Jyutping: 1. ngau^{4} che^{1} seui^{2} waang^{6} gaai^{1}; 2. hei^{2} jyun^{4} waang^{6} gaai^{1}; 3. ding^{1} ga^{1} nou^{4} gaai^{1}
Southern Min
- Hokkien POJ: 1. gu chia chui wha koi

Trengganu Street (Chinese: 丁加奴街; pinyin: Dīngjiānú Jiē) is a street located in Chinatown within the Outram Planning Area in Singapore. It is named after Terengganu, a state in the east coast of Peninsular Malaysia.

The road links Pagoda Street and Sago Street, and is intersected by Temple Street and Smith Street. A section of Trengganu Street from Pagoda Street to Smith Street was converted to a pedestrian mall in 1997, with the remaining section of the street and Sago Street also converted into a pedestrian mall in 2003 and now forms the heart of the tourist belt in Singapore's Chinatown.
