= Temple Street =

Temple Street may refer to:

== Roads ==
- Temple Street, Hong Kong
- Temple Street, Singapore
- Temple Street (Los Angeles), California, US
- Temple Street, Dublin, Ireland

== Other uses ==
- Temple Street (gang), a street gang in Los Angeles, California, US
- Temple Street Children's University Hospital, Dublin, Ireland
- Temple Street Productions, Toronto, Canada
