= Naraina Pillai =

Singaporean businessman and social entrepreneur

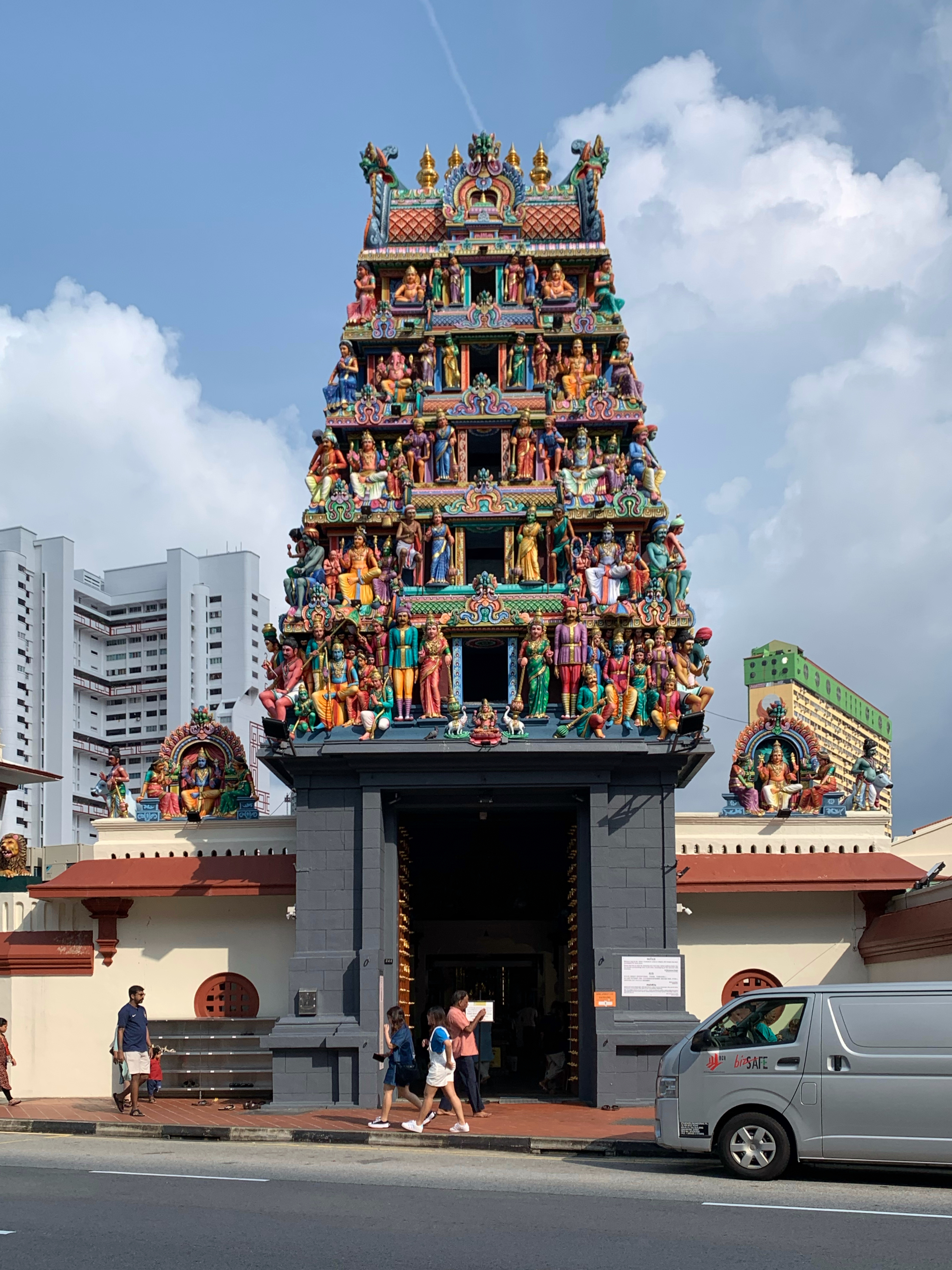
The present gopuram of the Sri Mariamman Temple was built in 1925, replacing an earlier tower. Although the temple was founded as an institution on its present site by Pillai in 1827, little remains of the original structure he built.

Narayana Pillai (also spelled Narayana Pillay) was a social entrepreneur and businessman, who spent most of his life in Singapore during the colonial period. Of Tamil origins, he greatly contributed to the Tamil community in Singapore.

Prior to 1819, Pillai worked in Penang, which was ruled by the British. There, he came into contact with Stamford Raffles, a senior official of the British East India Company, who was keen to establish a new trading post at the southern end of the Straits of Malacca. This resulted in the founding of modern Singapore in 1819. In Penang, Raffles persuaded Pillai to join him and to work at his new settlement.

== Early life ==
Pillai arrived in Singapore with Raffles in 1819 on the ship.

== Businesses ==
With the establishment of a modern urban settlement in Singapore, Pillai noticed a boom in building works. He wrote to his contacts in Penang to send bricklayers, carpenters and cloth merchants to Singapore. He then established the island’s first brick kiln at what is now Tanjong Pagar. Through these efforts, he also became Singapore’s first building contractor.

Pillai also ventured into the cotton goods trade where he sold these at Cross Street. In time, his shop became the largest and best known in town. However, a fire in 1822 destroyed his business, leaving him in debt to British merchants who had let him large volumes of cloth on credit. Pillai struggled to negotiate with his creditors, and also secured help from Raffles when the latter returned to visit Singapore. At land he obtained in Commercial Square (now Raffles Place), he erected new warehouses and rebuilt his business from scratch, eventually paying off his debts and remaking his wealth.

== Contributions ==
Apart from business, Pillai is also remembered for his social contributions. He was keen to build a temple on the island to serve the growing Hindu population there. After some difficulty in obtaining a suitable site, he was able to acquire land at South Bridge Road for the purpose in 1823. Here, he erected the Sri Mariamman Temple in 1827, which endures today as the oldest Hindu place of worship on the island, and one of the National Monuments of Singapore. Pillai also envisioned a Hindu Institute for young boys, but this did not materialize. Nevertheless, Pillai’s standing led to his appointment by the British as the chief of the Indian population, which conferred on him powers to settle disputes within the community.

== Awards ==
Pillay gained recognition as a leader amongst the Tamils and was appointed chief of Indians from Cholamandalaman, given the authority to settle disputes amongst the Tamils.

He was one of several local figures (like Sang Nila Utama) commemorated for the bicentennial establishing of modern Singapore in 2019 with their own statues erected in Raffles' Landing near the Singapore River. Pillai Road is named after him

== See also ==
- Tamils
- Hindu
- History of Singapore

== Notes ==
- Liu, Gretchen (1996). In Granite and Chunam: The national monuments of Singapore. Singapore: Landmark Books and Preservation of Monuments Board.
- Pearson, H.F. (1955). People of early Singapore. London: University of London Press.
- ‘Pioneer Naraina Pillai should be honoured’ (21 February 1990). The Straits Times, p. 14.
- ‘Singapore's first heroes’ (6 November 1983). The Straits Times, p. 18.
