= Sri Mariamman Temple, Singapore =

Hindu temple in Singapore

Sri Mariamman Temple
- ஶ்ரீ மாரியம்மன் கோவில்
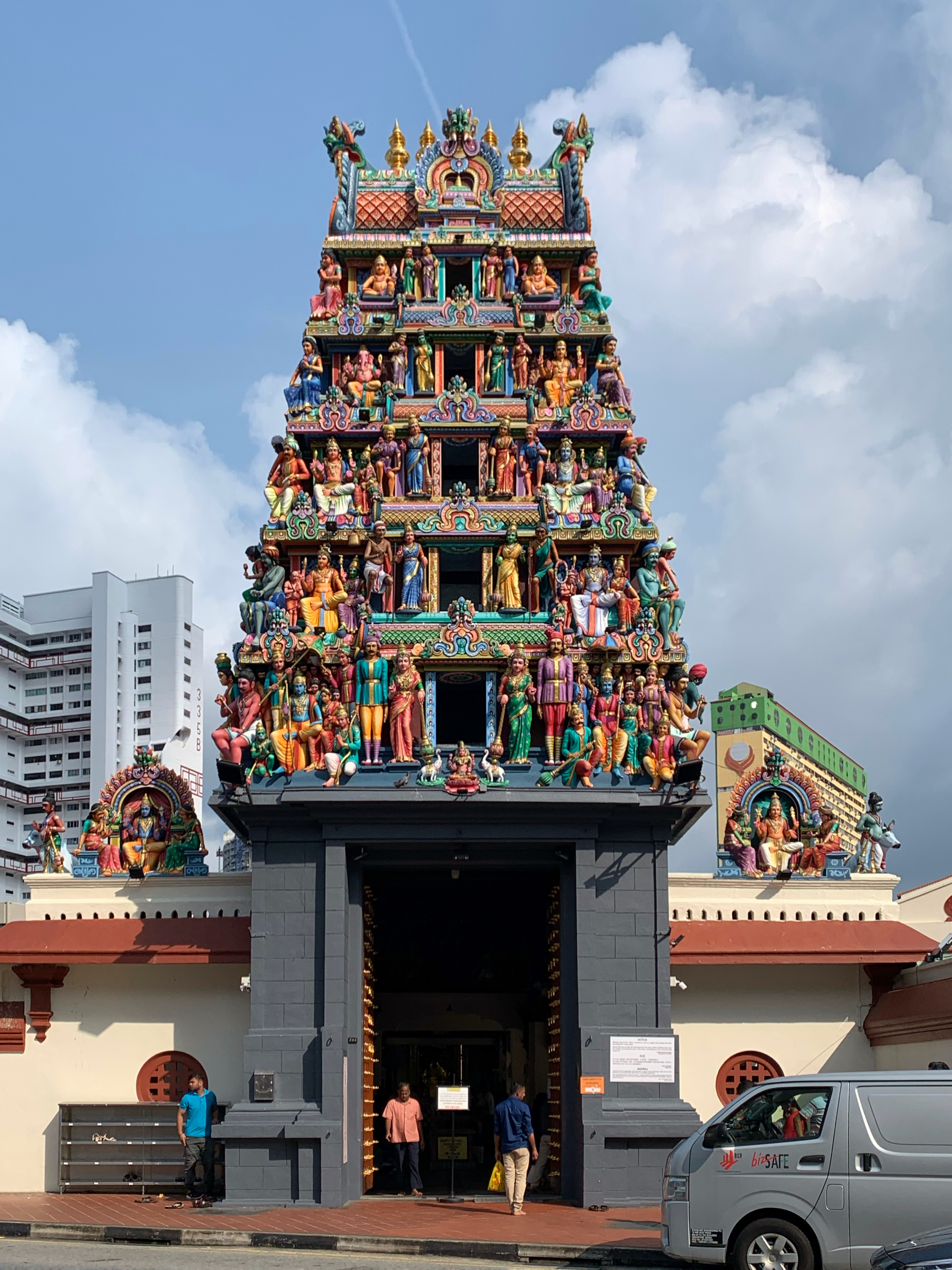
- The gopuram (entrance tower) of Sri Mariamman Temple

- Location within Singapore

Religion
- Affiliation: Hinduism
- Deity: Mariamman
- Festivals: Singapore Theemithi Festival, Deepavali, Aadi Perukku

Location
- Location: 244 South Bridge Road, Singapore 058793
- Country: Singapore
- Interactive map of Sri Mariamman Temple
- Coordinates: 1°16′57.4″N 103°50′43″E

Architecture
- Type: Dravidian architecture
- Creator: Naraina Pillai
- Completed: 1827; 199 years ago
- National monument of Singapore
- Designated: 6 July 1973; 53 years ago
- Reference no.: 6

Website
- Official website

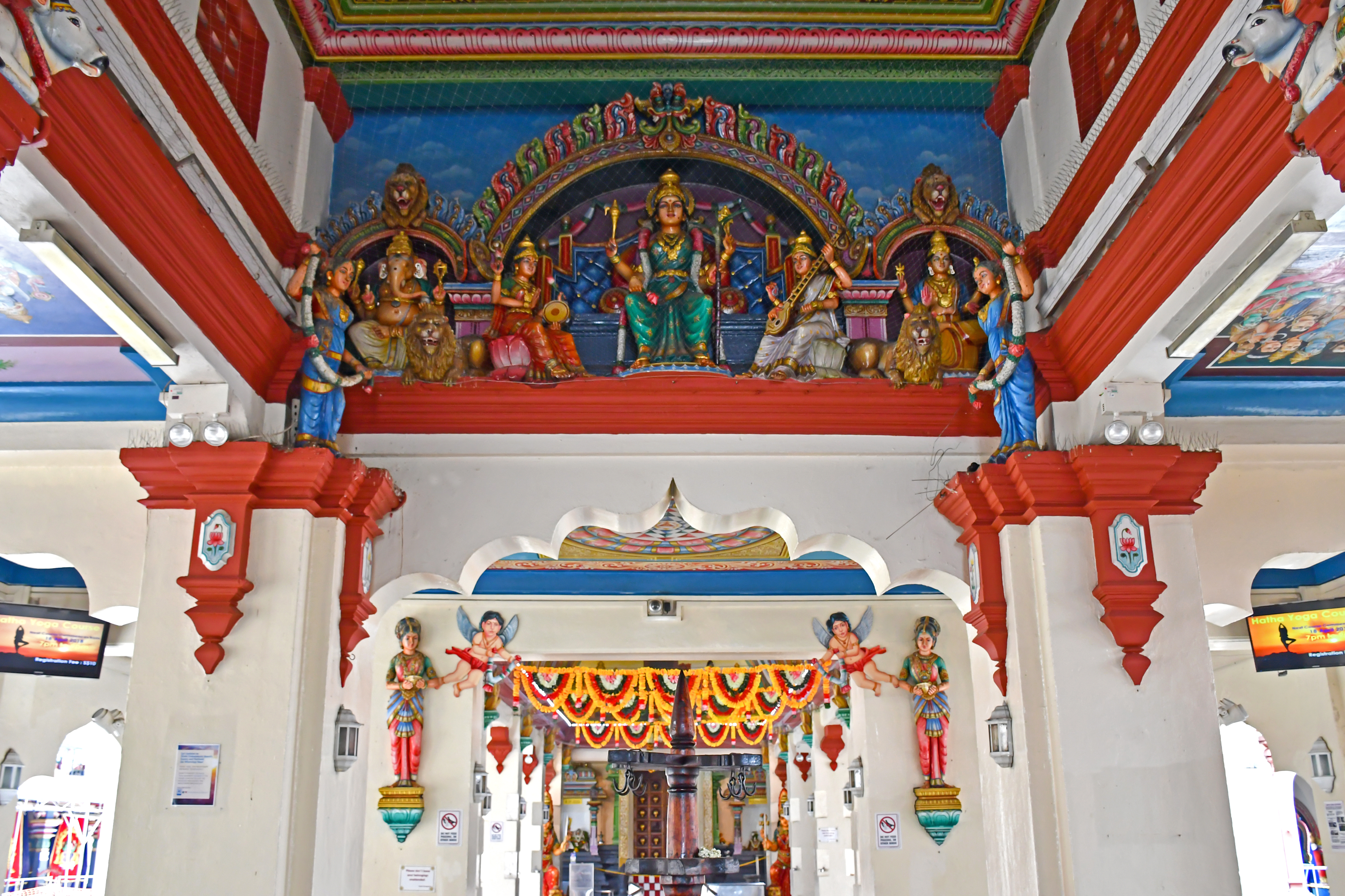
Main hallway and altar

The Sri Mariamman Temple (Tamil: ஸ்ரீ மாரியம்மன் கோவில், romanized: Srī Māriyam'maṉ Kōvil) is Singapore's first and oldest Hindu temple. It is an agamic temple, built in the Dravidian style. Located at 244 South Bridge Road, in the downtown Chinatown district, the temple serves the majority Hindu Singaporeans, Tamilians, in the city-state. Due to its architectural and historical significance, the temple has been gazetted a National Monument and is a major tourist attraction. Sri Mariamman Temple is managed by the Hindu Endowments Board, a statutory board under the Ministry of Community Development, Youth and Sports.

The Sri Mariamman Temple was founded in 1827 by Naraina Pillai, eight years after the East India Company established a trading settlement in Singapore. Pillai was a government clerk from Penang who arrived in Singapore with Sir Stamford Raffles on his second visit to the island in May 1819. Pillai went on to set up the island's first construction company, and also entered the textile trade. He rapidly established himself in business and was identified as a leader of the Indian community.

== History ==
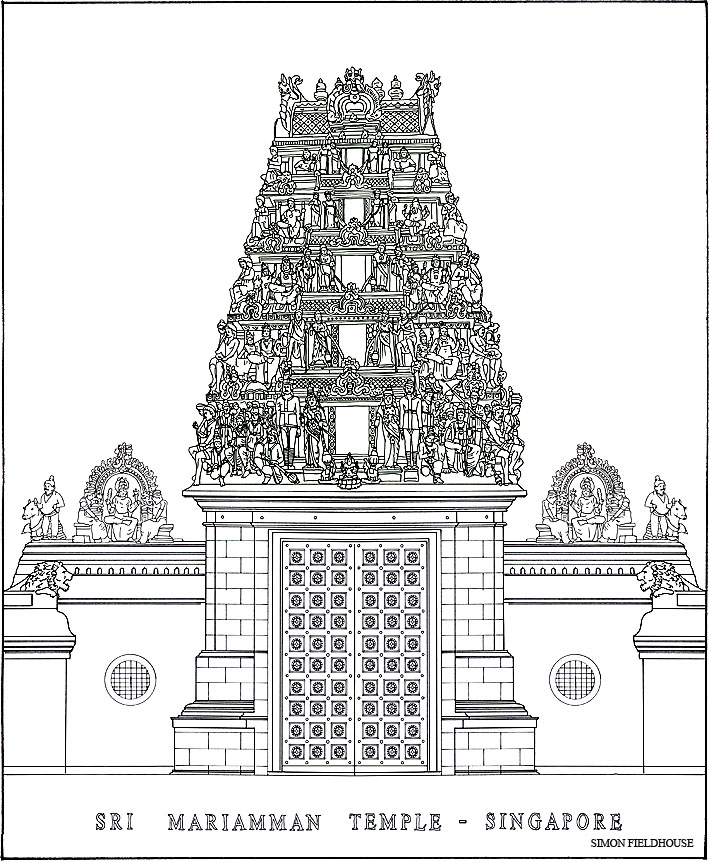
A line drawing of Sri Mariamman Temple

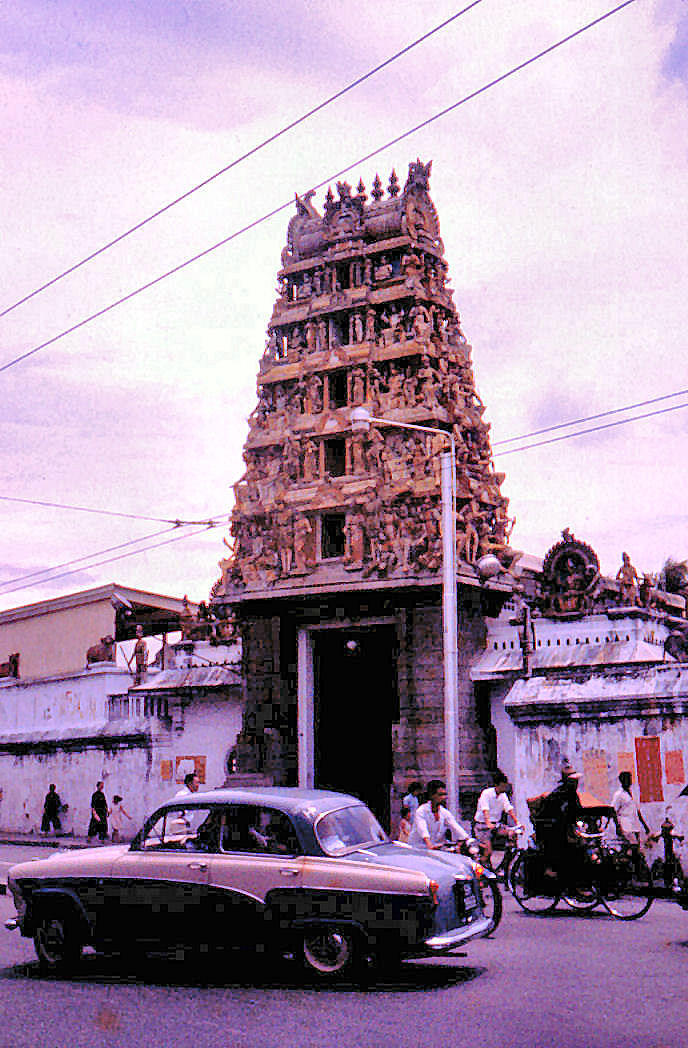
The Sri Mariamman Temple in 1960

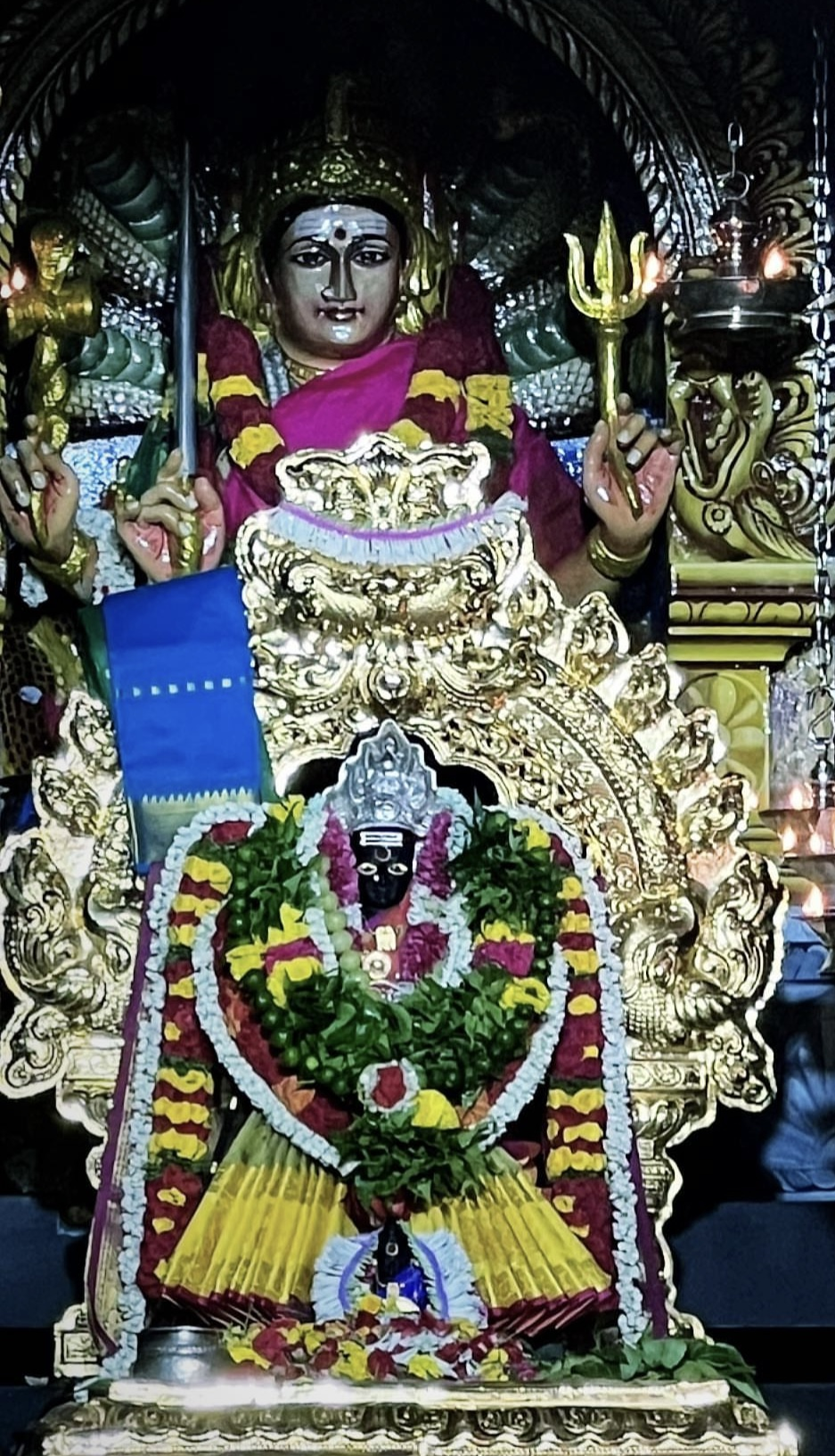
Shrine of the presiding deity Mariamman in the temple

Initially, the British authorities allotted land for a Hindu temple along Telok Ayer Street. This street ran alongside Telok Ayer Bay, where most early Asian immigrants first landed in Singapore, and where they went to pray and give thanks for a safe sea journey. The Thian Hock Keng and Nagore Durgha Shrine, respectively Singapore's earliest Chinese and Indian Muslim places of worship, are located there. However, Telok Ayer Street lacked a convenient source of fresh water which was needed for Hindu temple rituals.

The British Resident of Singapore, William Farquhar, then let Pillai occupy a site near Stamford Canal in 1821. Once again, the site proved unsuitable, this time due to the 1822 Jackson Plan which reserved the Stamford Canal area for other uses. However, the plan designated an alternative site next to the existing temple – marked as "Kling Chapel" ("Kling" was a neutral term for Indians in Singapore and Malaya but now considered derogatory). This site was near the area earmarked for the Indian community.

In 1823, the current South Bridge Road site was finally granted to Pillai for the purposes of erecting a Hindu temple. The side streets flanking the temple were later renamed in reference to the temple and its prominent tower – Pagoda Street and Temple Street.

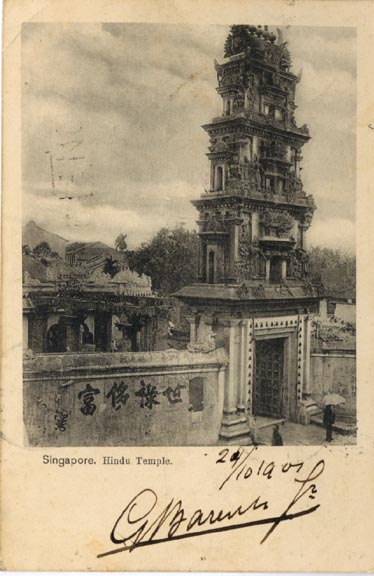
The original three-tiered gopuram in 1901

By 1827, Pillai had built a simple temple made of wood and attap. In the same year, he installed Sinna Amman, a small representation of the goddess Mariamman, in the temple. Mariamman is a rural South Indian mother goddess who is especially worshipped for protection against diseases. According to the Hindu Endowments Board, the current managers of the temple, the existing deity in the principal shrine of the temple is the original installed by Pillai in 1827. As is the common practice, the temple is named after its principal deity. The temple was also known to devotees over the years as the Sithi Vinayagar and Gothanda Ramaswamy Mariamman Temple or, more simply, Mariamman Kovil (kovil being the Tamil word for temple).

The temple grounds were expanded in 1831 when private land was donated to the temple. This event is recorded on a stone tablet which still stands in the temple. The text inscribed on this tablet reads: "The grant N:075 With its building transferred for charity sake to Cothunda Ramasamy by Sashasalapilly son of Cuddalore Amicarapoatrapilly Singapore March 1831".

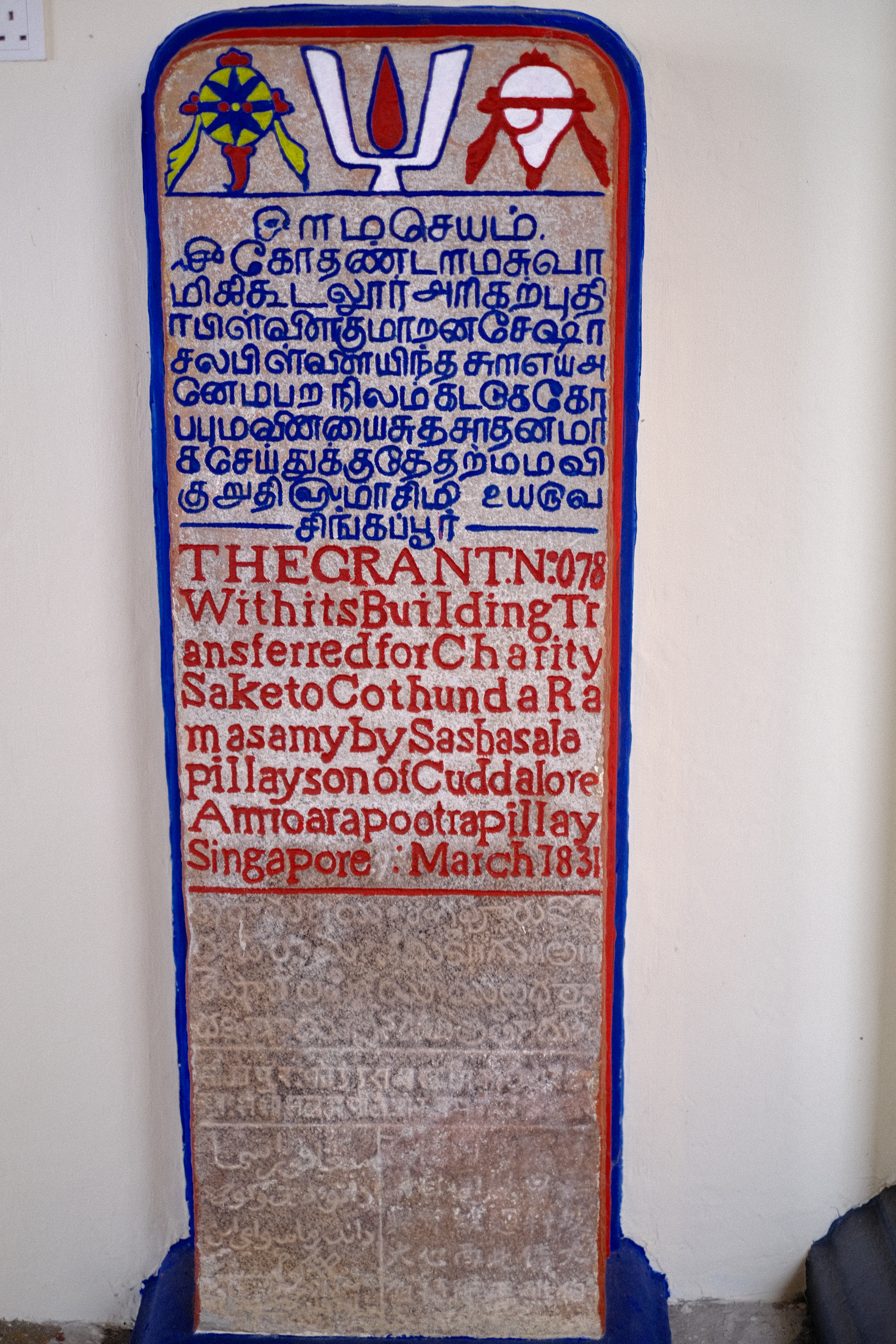
A stone inscribed with details of the Sri Mariamman Temple expansion, Singapore

The oldest parts of the existing brick structure date to 1843, and additions and alterations were subsequently made at various points in the history of the temple. It is believed that most of this work, especially the elaborate plaster sculptures and ornamentation, were produced by skilled craftsmen from the Nagapattinam and Cuddalore districts of Tamil Nadu in South India. A major part of the present structure is believed to have been built in 1862–1863. The walkway connecting the main entrance to the principal shrine was originally covered in attap, but this was destroyed in a fire in 1910. The architectural firm of Swan and Maclaren then designed a more permanent walkway in 1915.

The original three-tiered gopuram (entrance tower) was constructed in 1903. It was slimmer and less richly embellished than the current tower. The sides of the tower also appeared to be more stepped than sloping. Nonetheless, it had an iconic presence in Chinatown, and was a widely recognised landmark. The present six-tiered gopuram was built in 1925. It was repaired and restored with an elaborate proliferation of sculptures in the 1960s.

In the 1940s there was a well in the temple compound that has since been filled.

Sri Mariamman Temple was gazetted a National Monument on 6 July 1973 by the Preservation of Monuments Board.

An elevated viewing gallery was added to the temple which is especially popular with spectators during the annual timiti (firewalking) festival. Another major addition is a three-storey annexe building sited to the rear of the temple. This annexe has a separate entrance on to Pagoda Street, with an elaborate facade featuring traditional sculptural plasterwork. The spacious building has a fully equipped auditorium and facilities for weddings, multimedia presentations, corporate meetings, seminars and cultural events. The temple still stands today on the same place and location as was first built.

== Social role of the temple ==
Sri Mariamman Temple is important serving as a refuge for new immigrants, particularly South Indian Tamil Hindus. Besides providing an important place of worship for these immigrants, the temple granted them shelter until they found work and more permanent accommodation. Historically, the temple was the registry of marriages for Hindus. At that time, only the priest of the Sri Mariamman Temple was authorised to solemnise Hindu marriages in Singapore. Today, in addition to its religious services and functions, the temple promotes various social, cultural and educational activities.

== Art and architecture ==
Built in the South Indian architecture| style, this temple features a gopuram that rises above the main entrance along South Bridge Road. It is richly embellished with six tiers of sculptures of Hindu deities, other figures and ornamental decorations. The tower tapers up towards to a moulded ornamental ridge. The scale of each tier and its sculptures is slightly smaller than that of the tier immediately below it. This helps to create the illusion of height and adds to the symbolic importance of the building. Flanking the gopuram are a sculpture of Murugan on the right and Krishna on the left (as one enters). The sculptures are all of plaster, which allows for fine detailing. They are painted in a variety of bright colours, which adds to the visually spectacular quality of the gopuram.

The floor plan of the gopuram base block is rectangular and is bisected by an entrance passageway. The entrance contains a pair of very large double-leaf timber doors. The scale of these doors is intended to induce humility in the visitor and emphasise the diminutive human scale in relation to the divine. The doors are studded with small gold bells arranged in a grid pattern, which devotees are supposed to ring as they move through. Footwear is also stored around the entrance area, as it is not allowed within Hindu temples as a sign of respect.

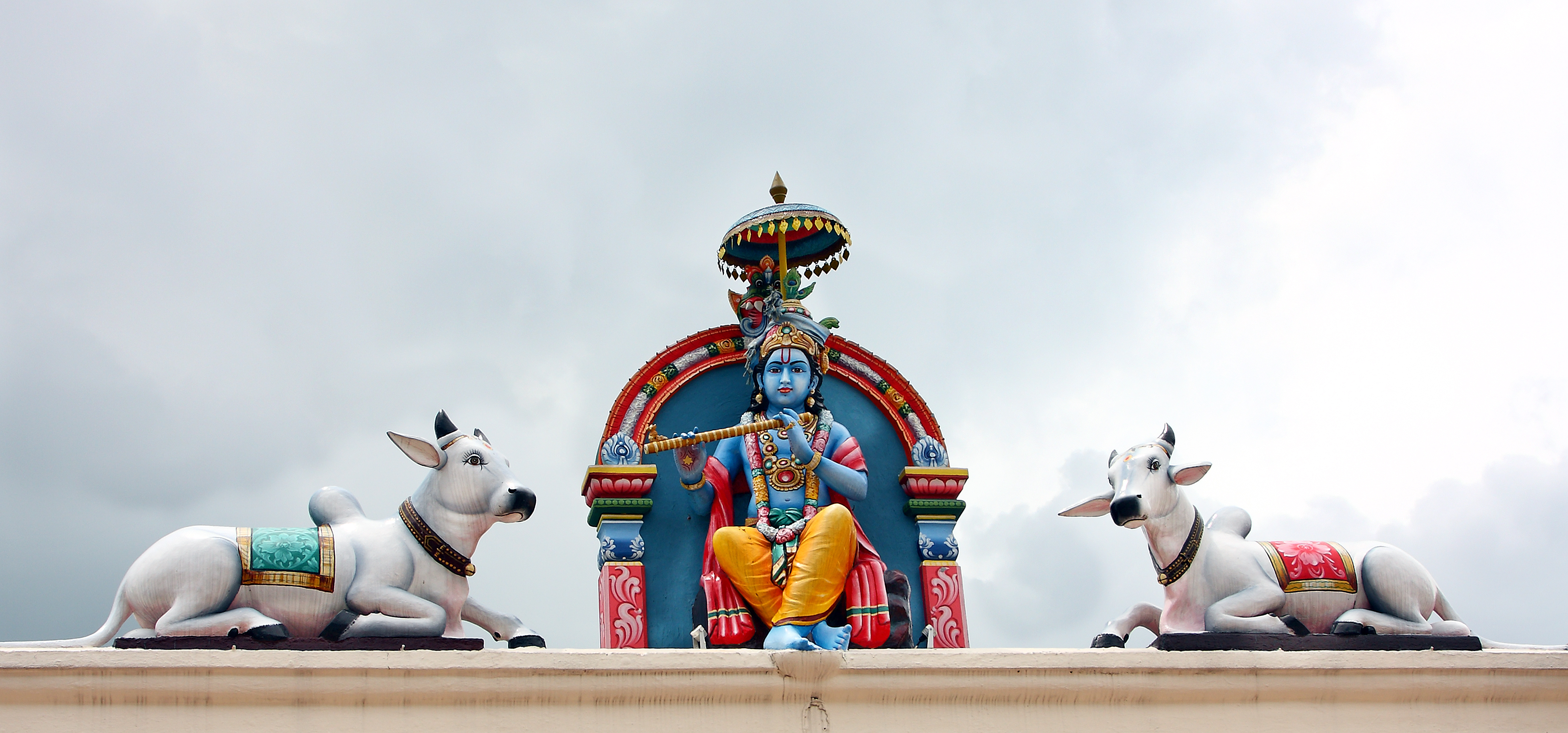
Detail of the temple exterior showing Krishna flanked by two cows.

The main entrance with the gopuram is only one of the entrances into the temple compound, which is surrounded by a perimeter wall. Side openings also exist, which open on to the flanking Pagoda Street and Temple Street. However, these are mainly used as service entrances, with all devotees and visitors entering through the gopuram doors. The compound wall is also decorated with ornamental mouldings, as well as figures placed on top of the wall at various points, including several prominent seated cow sculptures.

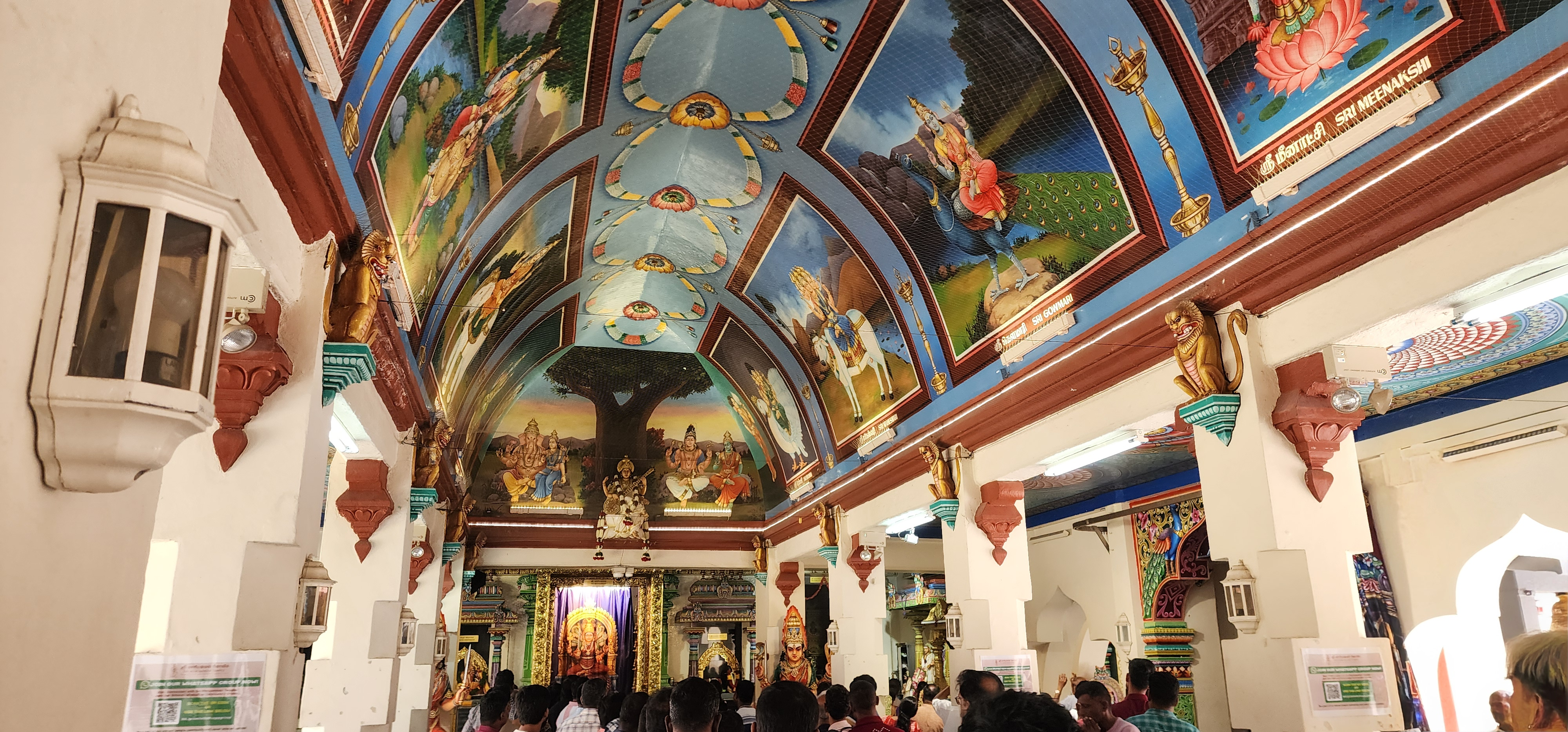
Paintings on the temple ceiling.

Within the walled compound, the temple comprises a combination of covered halls, shrines and service areas, as well as courtyards open to the sky. Leading directly from the gopuram entrance through a covered hall is the main prayer area, with richly ornamented columns and ceilings with frescoes. The ceiling paintings include a large mandala diagram.

== Shrines and deities ==
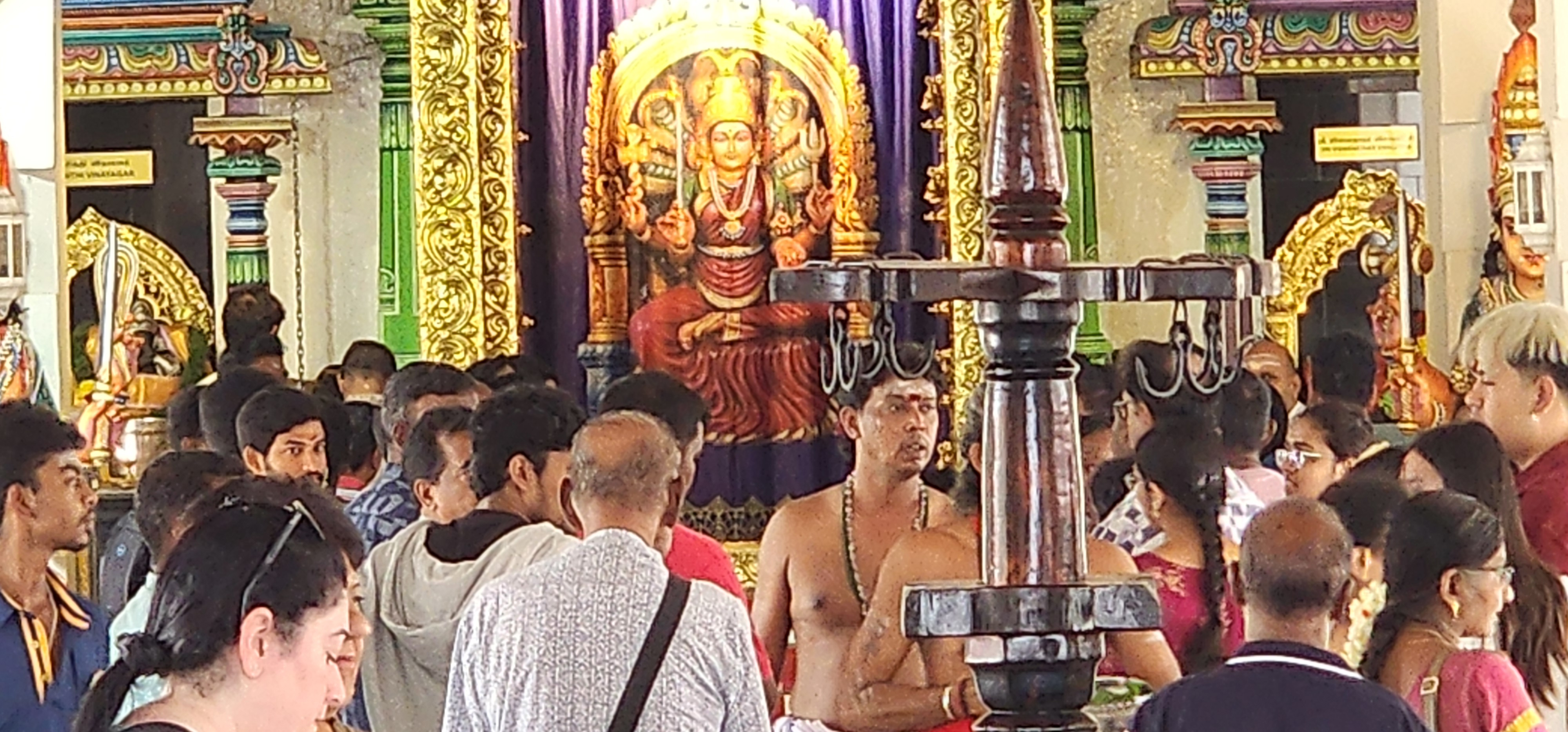
A procession at the temple.

The focus of the main prayer hall is the central shrine of Mariamman, which is flanked by the shrines of two secondary deities, Rama and Murugan. The main prayer hall is surrounded by a series of free-standing shrines, housed in pavilion-like structures with decorated dome roofs, known as Vimana. These are dedicated to the following deities: Durga, Ganesha, and Shiva.

The shrine to Draupadi is the second most important in the temple, as she is central to the annual thimithi or firewalking festival held in this temple. To the left of Draupadi are the five Pandavas from the Mahabharata epic – Yudhishthira, Bhima, Arjuna, Sahadeva and Nakula. They are presided over by Lord Krishna.

Another important element of the temple is the free-standing flagpole (dhvajastambham). A few days before major festivals or ritual ceremonies, a flag is raised here.

== Kumbhabhishekham ==
Kumbhabhishekham is a Hindu temple ritual that is believed to homogenize, synergize and unite the mystic powers of the deity. This process is believed to keep the icon rejuvenated for a period of 12 years. Sri Mariamman Temple's first Kumbhabhishekham was recorded in 1936 whereas the last one has taken place on 12 February 2023.

== Festivals ==
A 1913 film showing the timiti (firewalking) festival at the temple

Once every 12 years, in keeping with Hindu tradition, the temple is reconsecrated. An annual Singapore Theemithi Festival is held about a week before Deepavali, the Festival of Lights.

== See also ==
- Hinduism in Singapore
- Sri Mahamariamman Temple, Kuala Lumpur
