= Pagoda Street =

Street in Chinatown, Singapore

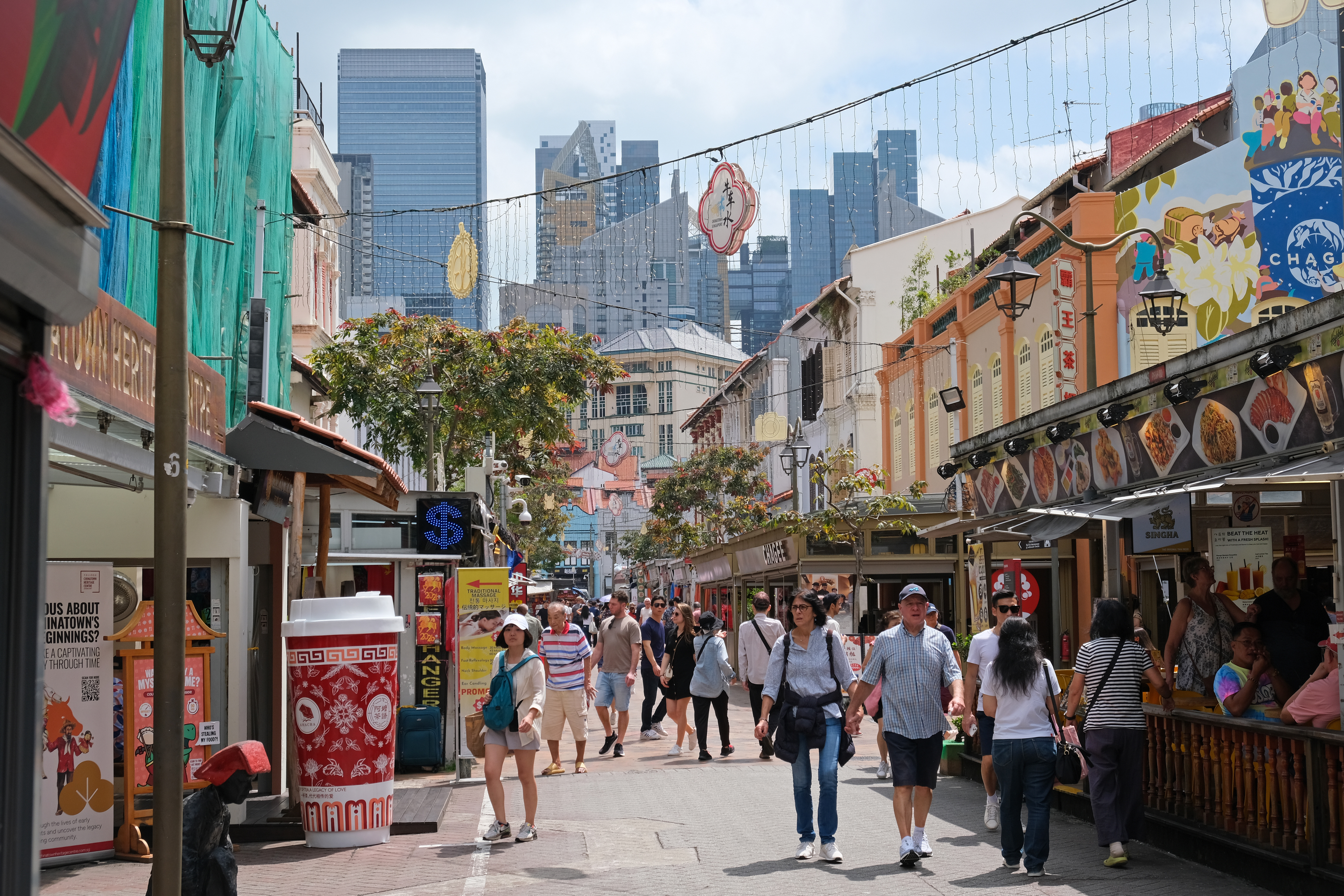
Pagoda Street, Chinatown, Singapore

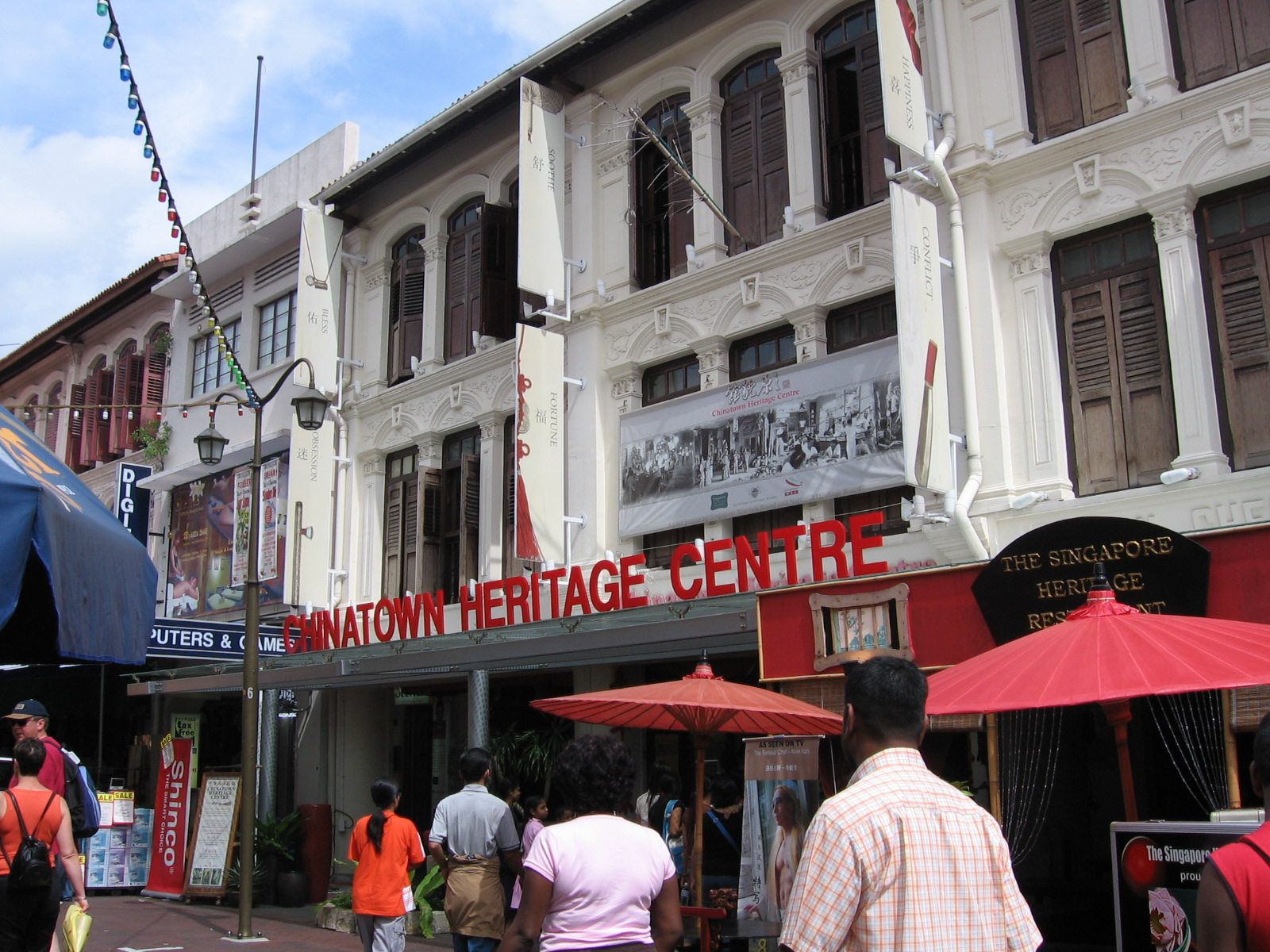
Chinatown Heritage Centre on Pagoda Street

Pagoda Street (Chinese: 宝塔街; pinyin: bǎo tǎ jiē) is a street located in Chinatown within the Outram Planning Area in Singapore. The road links New Bridge Road and South Bridge Road, but has since been converted to a pedestrian mall to Chinatown MRT station at its New Bridge Road end.

The Chinatown Heritage Centre, located on Pagoda Street, provides an overview of the life of early Chinese settlers in Chinatown.

== Etymology and history ==
Pagoda Street was named after the pagoda-like gopuram of Sri Mariamman Temple, the largest and oldest Hindu temple in Singapore, located on the South Bridge Road end of the street. Due to Sri Mariamman Temple, the street was called kit ling a le pai au in Hokkien, meaning "behind the kling place of worship" where Kling is an old reference to Indians.

The street was known for its opium smoking den and also as one of the coolie trade stations between the 1850s and the 1880s. One famous firm for the coolie trade located at the street was Kwong Hup Yuen and later known as Kian Seng Heng Bicycle Trader of 37 Pagoda Street. This leads to the Cantonese to call this street as kwong hup yuan kai. In the early 1900s, many shophouses along the street became coolie lodging places due to the coolie trade.

By the 1930s, the coolie trade in Singapore stopped and hence the many coolie lodging places went out of business. By the 1950s, the shophouses changed to retail trade and services and became well known for textile and tailor shops.

The architecture of the shophouses on Pagoda Street and other parts of Chinatown originates from the Raffles Town Plan of 1822, which stipulated the material that should be used to build the shophouses as well as the need to have covered walkways of five-foot width (hence known as "five-foot ways").

In the late 1980s, Chinatown was gazetted as a Historic District for conservation and the street was included.
