= South Bridge Road =

Road in Singapore

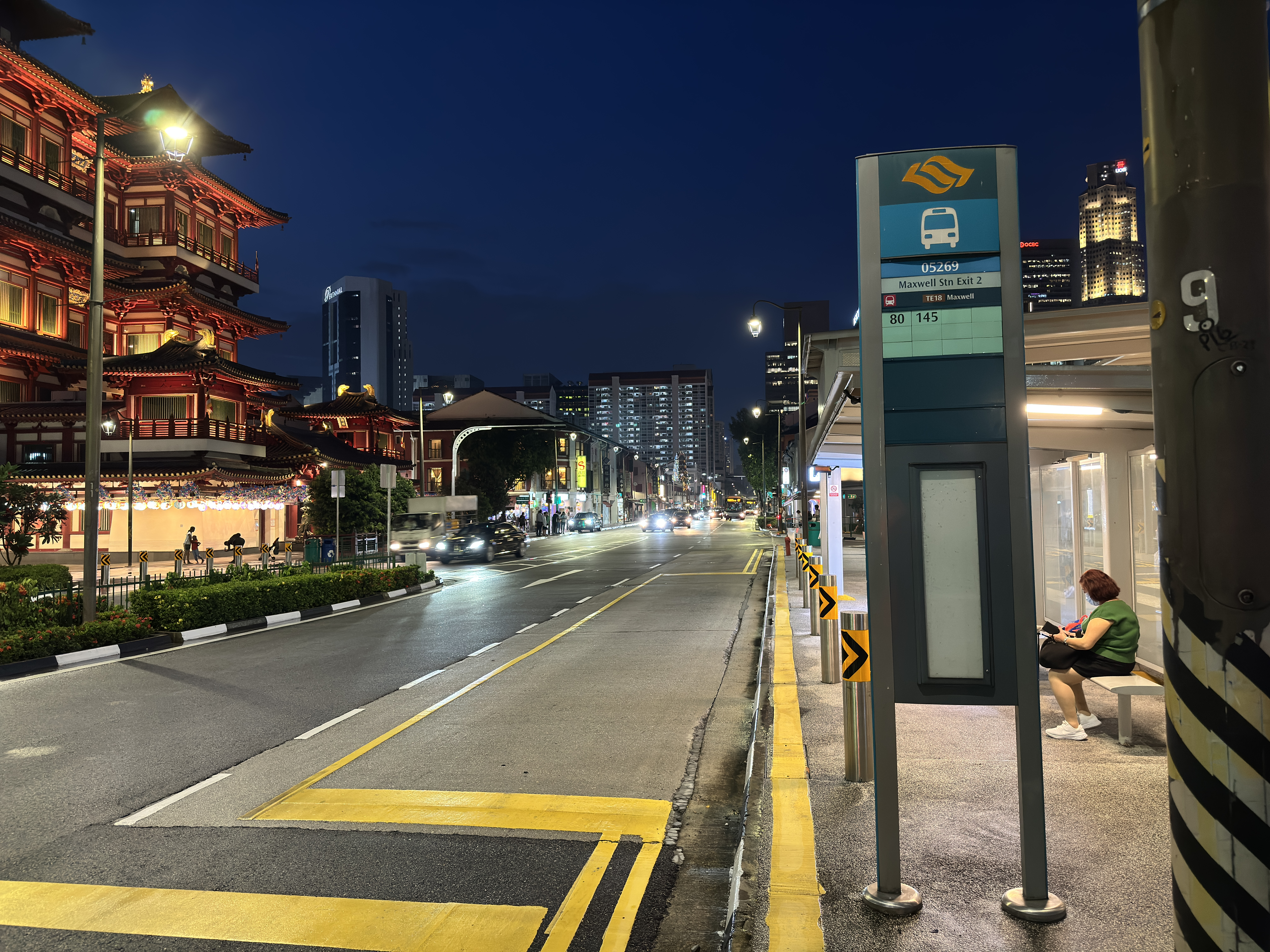
- South Bridge Road at the Maxwell area

Route information
- Length: 1.7 km (1.1 mi)
- Existed: 1830s–present

Major junctions
- Northern end: Elgin Bridge
- Southern end: Neil Road, Tanjong Pagar Road and Maxwell Road

Location
- Country: Singapore

Highway system
- Transport in Singapore

South Bridge Road is a major road in Singapore, running south of the Singapore River in Chinatown. It starts at Elgin Bridge from North Bridge Road and ends at the junction of Neil Road, Tanjong Pagar Road and Maxwell Road.

== History ==
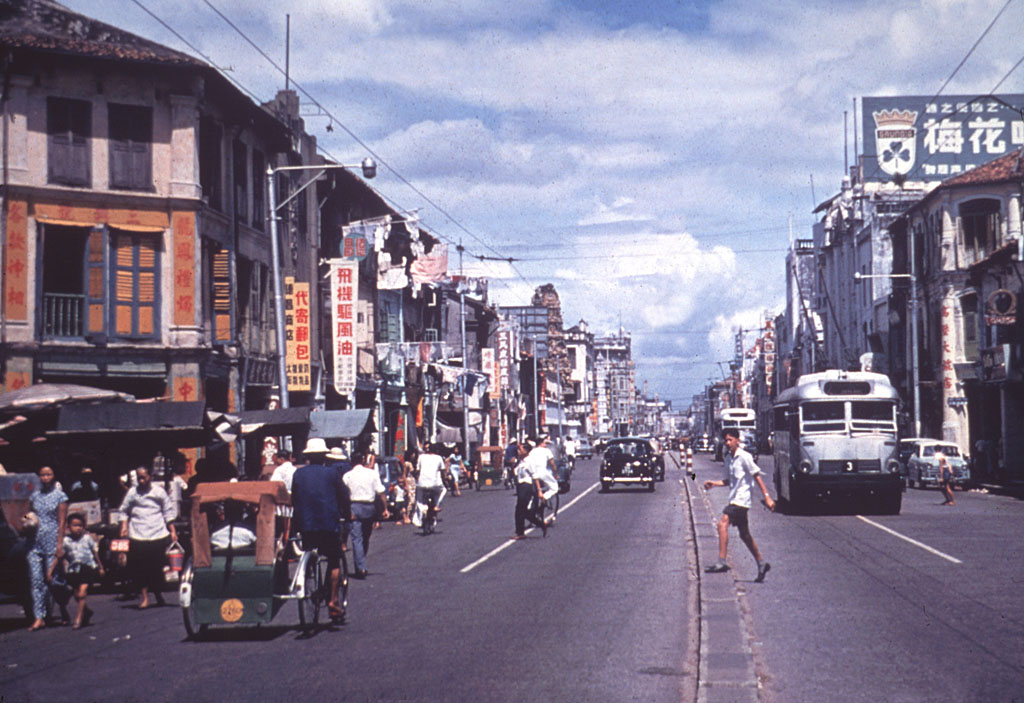
A view of the road in 1965

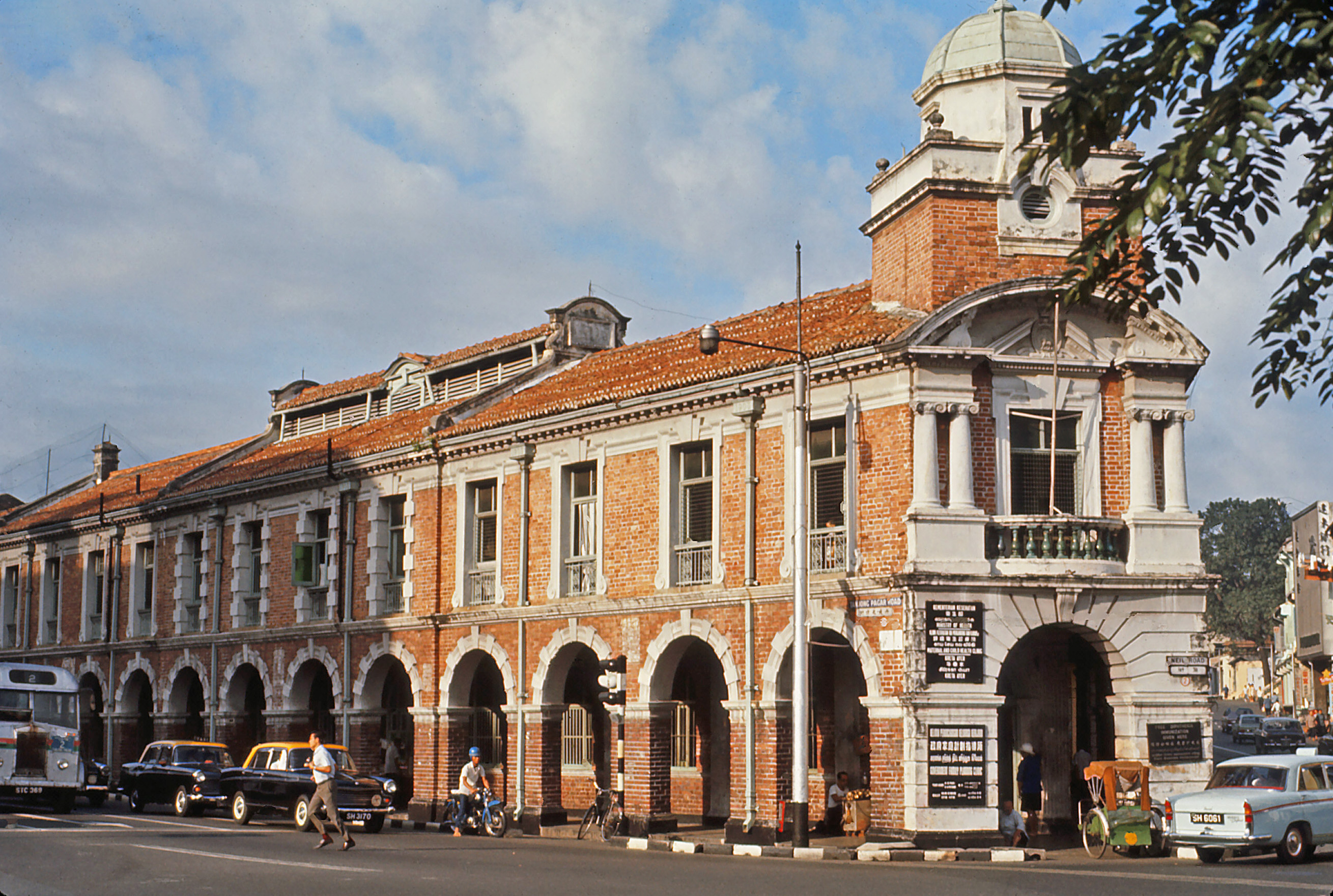
The southern end of the road in 1971, facing Tanjong Pagar Road on the left and Neil Road on the right

South Bridge Road was built in 1833. From 1885 to 1894, the tramway from the town to the New Harbour (now Keppel Harbour) used this road. From 1905 to 1927, Singapore Electric Tramways Company ran their trams along the road. In 1929, trolley buses also used this road.

== Landmarks ==
- Buddha Tooth Relic Temple
- Elgin Bridge
- Eu Yan Sang
- Fook Hai Building
- Hong Lim Complex
- Jamae Mosque
- Maxwell Food Centre
- Maxwell MRT station
- One George Street (or ERGO insurance building; formerly Pidemco Centre)
- Sri Mariamman Temple
