= Smith Street, Singapore =

Street in Singapore

Coordinates: 1°16′57.6″N 103°50′36.8″E

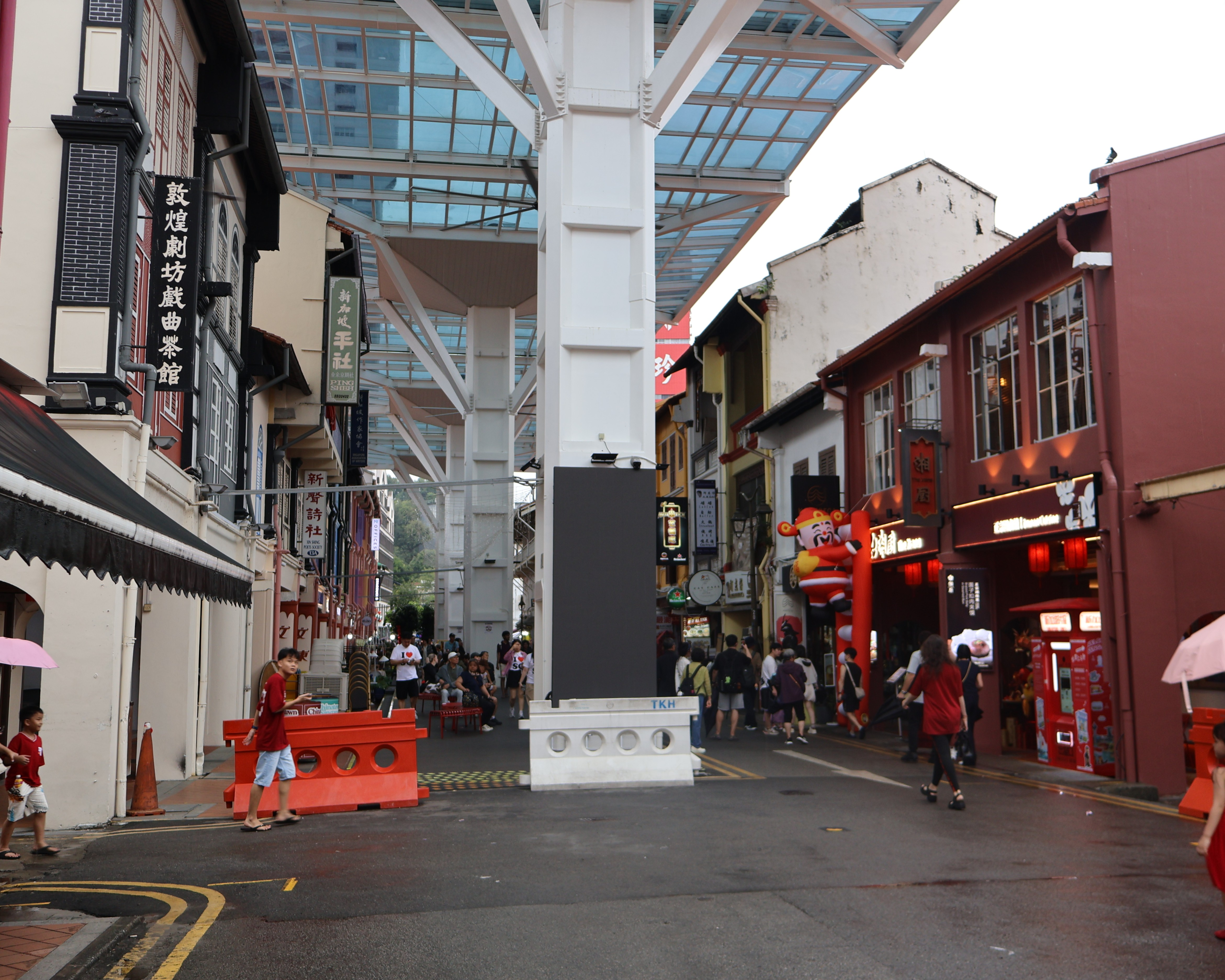
Smith Street as viewed from South Bridge Road

Smith Street (Chinese: 史密斯街 shǐ mì sī jiē) is a small street running through the heart of the Chinatown district in Singapore. The only road in the area to be named after a European, it commemorates the hugely popular Sir Cecil Clementi Smith, then Governor of the Straits Settlements and High Commissioner in 1887 to 1893, who was a Chinese scholar and responsible for most of the work to combat the problems of secret societies.

As is common for roads with English names, it has an informal Chinese name, hei yuen kai, meaning Theatre Street in reference to the Lai Chun Yuen Theatre then located at unit 36 and the centre of entertainment in the Kreta Ayer area.

Its red-light reputation contributed character to the street, which was also known for hawker stalls crowding into the street during its heyday reputation as the main "Food Street". There are attempts to recreate the ambiance today by closing parts of the road and turning it into an outdoor eating area.

A local joke has it that the road got its English name when the British asked Chinese locals the name of the road, they given clueless answers "Si mi?" (Hokkien for What?) as they could not understand English. Thus they duly recorded the name as "Smith" instead.
