= Masjid Al-Abrar =

Historic mosque in Chinatown, Singapore

Al-Abrar Mosque مسجد الأبرار Kūchu Paḷḷi (குச்சுப் பள்ளி)

- Location in Singapore

Religion
- Affiliation: Sunni Islam

Location
- Location: 192 Telok Ayer Street Singapore 068635
- Country: Singapore
- Coordinates: 1.2802922°N 103.8473097°E

Architecture
- Type: Mosque
- Style: Indo-Islamic architecture
- Founder: Hadjee Puckery Mohamed Khatib bin Shaik Mydin
- Established: 1827
- Completed: 1910 (Reconstructed 2003)
- Designated as NHL

National monument of Singapore
- Designated: 19 November 1974; 51 years ago
- Reference no.: 10

The Al-Abrar Mosque (Malay: Masjid Al-Abrar; Jawi: مسجد الأبرار) is a historic mosque located along Telok Ayer Street in Chinatown, Singapore. It was built in 1827 by Indian Muslim immigrants and later gazetted as a national monument of Singapore in 1974. It is one of two Islamic heritage sites along Telok Ayer Street, the other being the Nagore Durgha.

== Etymology ==
The mosque is known as Masjid Al-Abrar, with "Al-Abrar" being an Arabic word that refers to people of righteousness and piety, as well as being the plural form of the word "Barr" which refers to piety itself. In the Tamil language, the mosque is known as the Kūchu Paḷḷi, which literally means "hut mosque."

== History ==
In 1827, Tamil immigrants from South India, known as the Chulias, built the Al-Abrar Mosque along Telok Ayer Street on land that was endowed under waqf by an Indian Muslim merchant named Hadjee Puckery Mohamed Khatib bin Shaik Mydin. The structure took the form of a wattle-and-daub hut and was later replaced by a brick mosque that was built between 1850 and 1855. It was one of two mosques in the area established by the Chulias, the other being the Jamae Mosque along South Bridge Road that was completed in the 1830s. After the independence of Singapore, both mosques fell under the purview of the Majlis Ugama Islam Singapura (MUIS).

A religious celebration held inside the mosque.

The Al-Abrar Mosque was gazetted as the tenth national monument of Singapore on 19 November 1974. Haji Mohamed Yusoff, a secretary of the mosque's committee, rebuilt the mosque into a larger two-storey structure in 1986 that was able to accommodate nine hundred worshippers. Then in 1996, the mosque acquired a neighbouring two-storey shophouse which was converted into an extension of the main mosque building.

== Architecture ==
The design of the building is based on Indo-Islamic architecture with two tall minarets at the front.

The building was built along a row of shophouses, and the frontage incorporated a five-foot way (1.524 m) that connects the walkway of the other shophouses.

== Transportation ==
As is the case with the other national monuments along the same street, the Al-Abrar Mosque is within walking distance from the Telok Ayer MRT station on the Downtown Line.

== See also ==
- Islam in Singapore
- List of mosques in Singapore
