= Nagore Durgha, Singapore =

Indian Muslim heritage centre in Telok Ayer, Singapore

Nagore Durgha நாகூர் தர்கா Nà Gōng Shén Shè (纳宫神社)
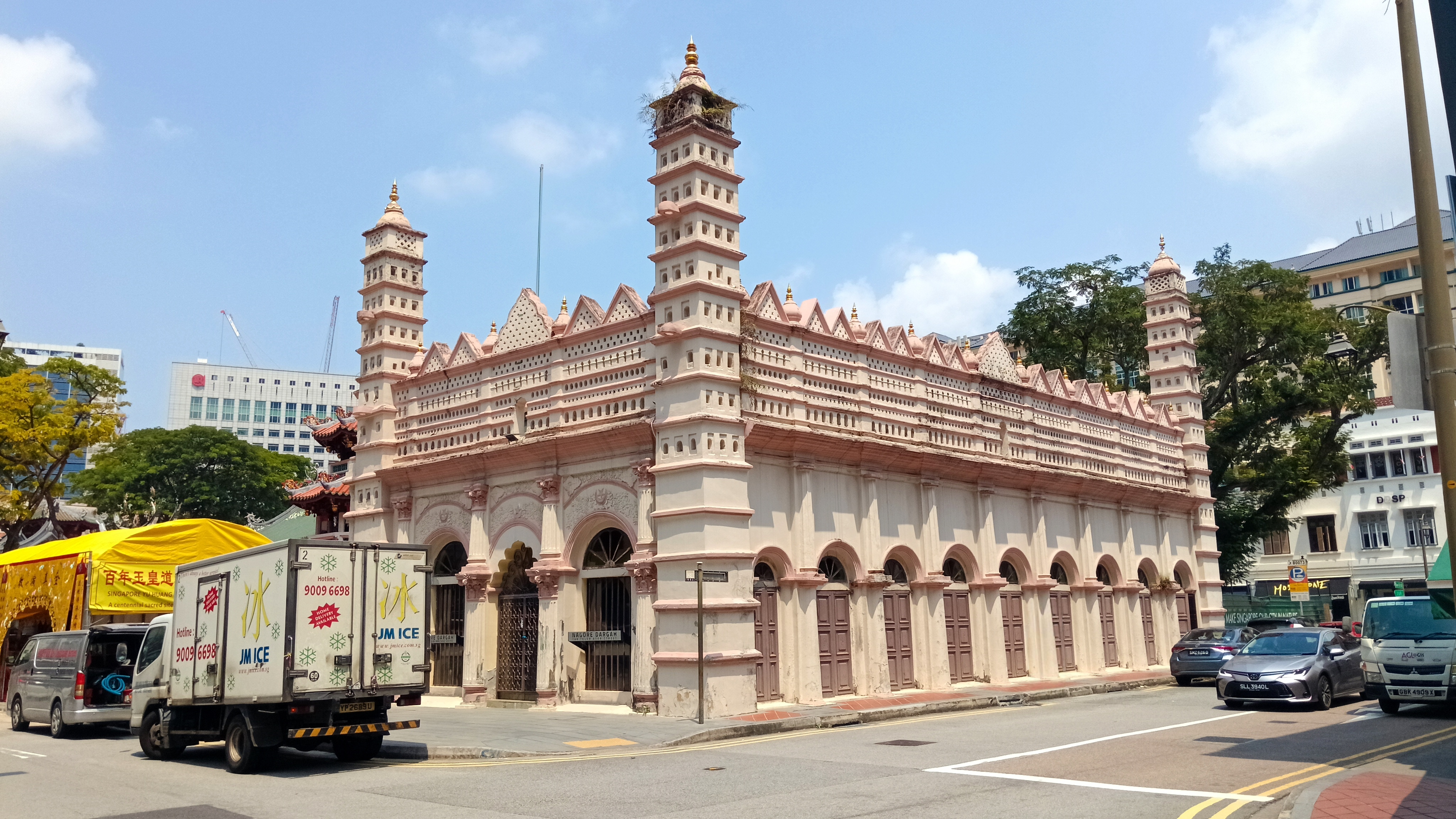

- Location in Singapore

Religion
- Affiliation: Sunni Islam

Location
- Location: 140 Telok Ayer Street, Singapore 068604
- Country: Singapore
- Coordinates: 1.2814101°N 103.8478254°E

Architecture
- Type: Heritage centre, formerly shrine and mosque
- Style: Eclectic
- Founder: Kaderpillai
- Completed: c. 1828 (Reconstructed 2011)
- Minaret: 3
- Designated as NHL

National monument of Singapore
- Designated: 19 November 1974; 51 years ago
- Reference no.: 9

The Nagore Durgha (Tamil: நாகூர் தர்கா) is an Indian Muslim heritage centre and a national monument of Singapore, located along Telok Ayer Street in the Chinatown district. It originated in the 19th century as a shrine dedicated to a prominent Muslim sage, Nagore Shahul Hamid. It is one of two Islamic monuments in the area, the other being Masjid Al-Abrar.

== Etymology ==
The name of the building, Nagore Durgha, is a localized variation of the Tamil language name of the Nagore Dargah, a large shrine and mosque complex located in Tamil Nadu dedicated to Muslim ascetic Nagore Shahul Hamid. It is also known as Nà Gōng Shén Shè (纳宫神社) or the Nagaku Shrine in Singaporean Mandarin. It has also been registered under the name "Masjid Moulana Mohamed Ali" during its time as a temporary mosque.

== History ==
The original structure was built between 1828 to 1830 by the Chulias, a group of South Indian immigrants who worked in areas around what is now the present-day Chinatown district, on land that was endowed by a man named Kaderpillai. It served as a memorial to Nagore Shahul Hamid, a Muslim sage from Tamil Nadu who was held in high reverence by the Chulias. Two brothers named Mohammed and Haja Mohiddeen, imported building materials including limestone, concrete and steel supports from overseas in order to build the shrine. The cenotaph of the saint, designed to look like a grave, was later revered as a keramat by later generations of devotees at the shrine. Similar shrines of the same name in Penang and wider Malaysia have also been erected in honour of Nagore Shahul Hamid, also done by Chulias.

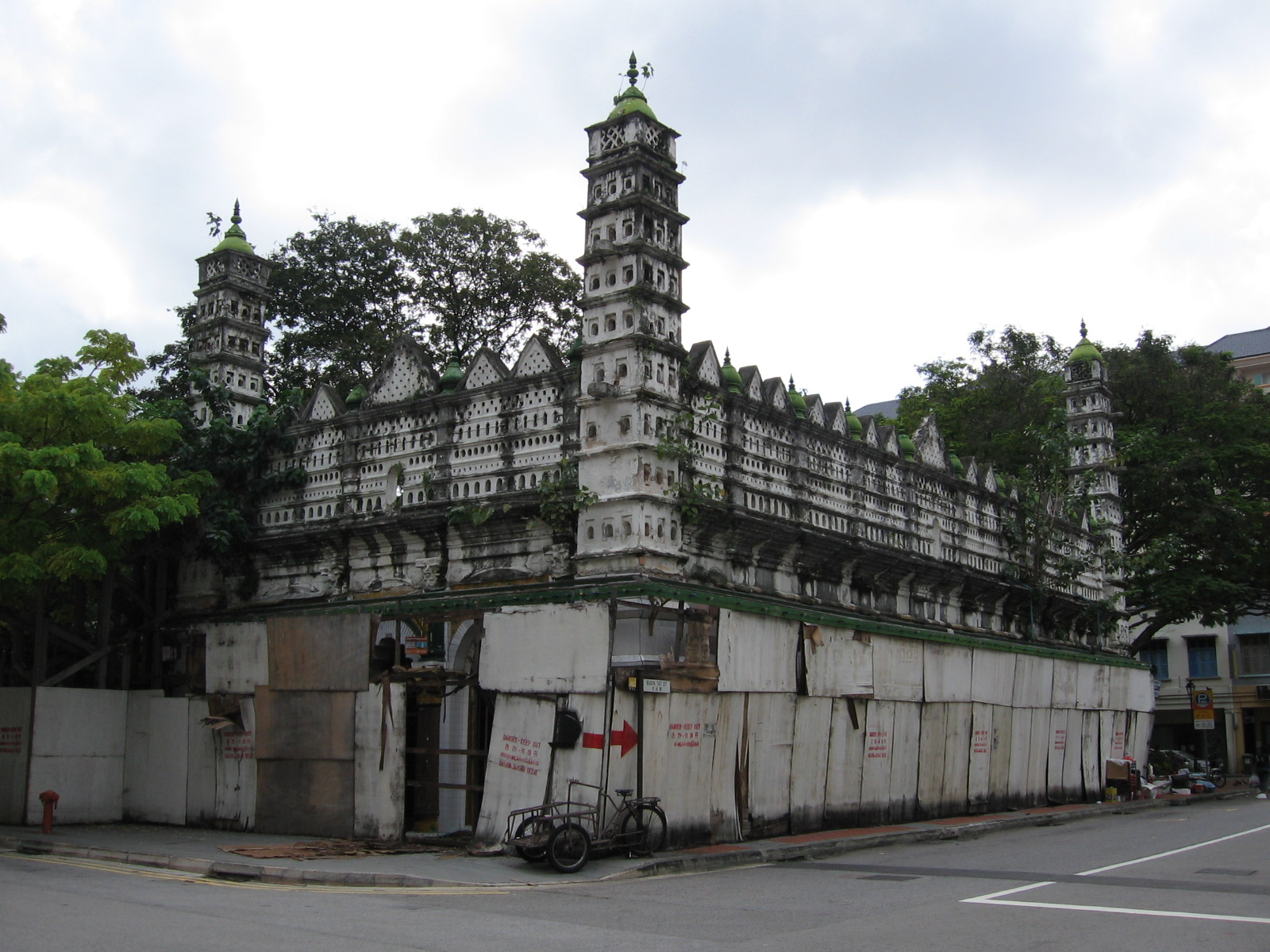
The dilapidated Nagore Durgha in 2006, before the 2011 reconstruction.

Ownership of the Nagore Durgha was undertaken by the Majlis Ugama Islam Singapura (MUIS) after 1968. The shrine was later gazetted as a national monument on 19 November 1974 by the National Heritage Board. Then in 1994, the shrine was used as a temporary congregational mosque to serve former congregants of the Moulana Mosque which had been demolished to make way for the construction of the UOB Plaza. When the new Moulana Mohamed Ali Mosque had been erected nearby in 1995, daily prayers were moved to the new mosque and were officially discontinued at the shrine.

In 1996, the shrine was in a dilapidated state and hence locked down for the safety of the public. Then in May of 2005, the MUIS confirmed that the shrine would be converted into a heritage centre and miniature museum to honour the contributions of Indian Muslims to the country. The shrine was extensively renovated and reopened on 29 May 2011 as an official Indian Muslim heritage centre by S.R. Nathan, who was serving as the President of Singapore at the time. Further renovation works were done in mid 2013 and completed by 6 January 2015, with the introduction of a new multimedia exhibit featuring stories of pioneers from the Indian Muslim community.

== Architecture ==
The Nagore Durgha features eclecticism in architecture, with a primary exterior appearance of Indo-Saracenic architecture. A group of Corinthian capitals line the four facades and support the main entrance to the building which faces Telok Ayer Street. Four identical and decorative minaret-like appendages, each with fourteen layers and topped by an onion dome, flank each of the four corners of the main building. The building has a rectangular layout, with the eastern facade and breadth facing Telok Ayer Street while the northern facade faces Boon Tat Street. Overall, the shrine is identical in design to both Masjid Jamae as well as the memorials dedicated to Nagore Shahul Hamid in Penang.

As a museum, the interior of the former shrine is full of exhibits relating to the history and culture of the local Indian Muslim community. Formerly, two keramats painted yellow were present in the shrine. Along with any other religious ornamentation, the cenotaphs had since been removed in the 2010s. There is also a prayer hall for worshippers within the building which has been preserved, although it is not used for prayers.

== Gallery ==
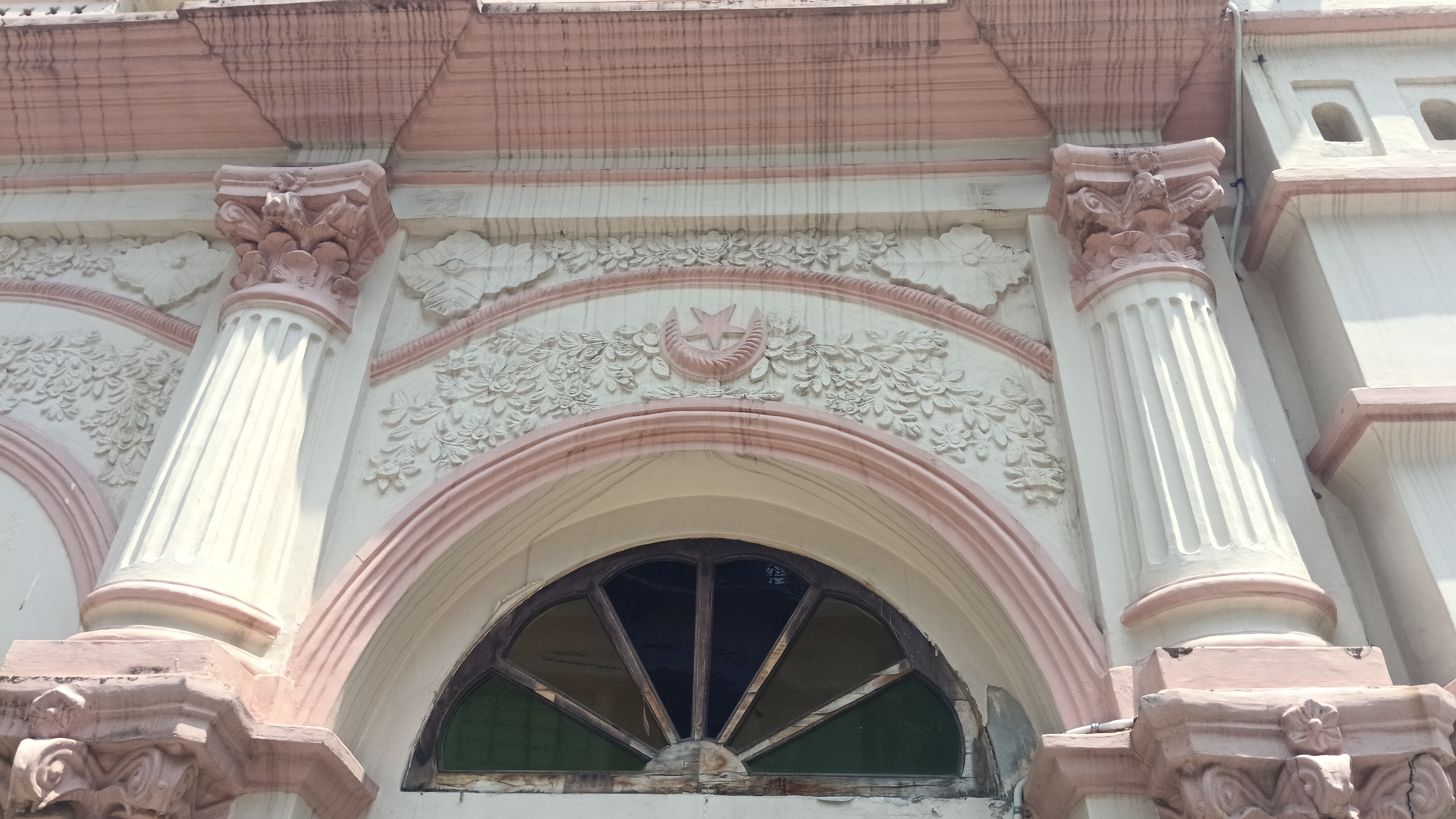
A closeup of a window at the entrance of the shrine.

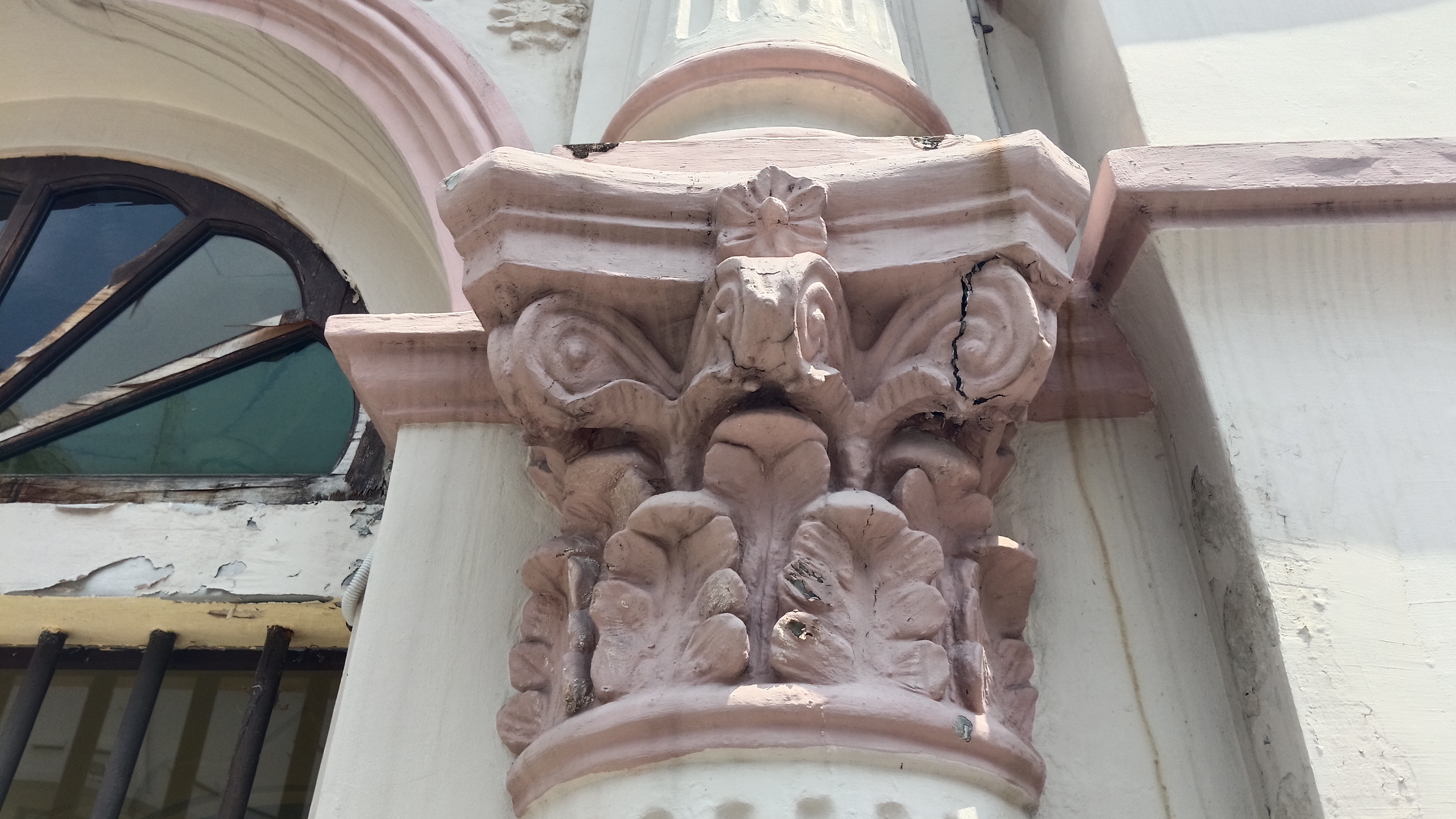
Floral details at the midsection of a pillar at the entrance.

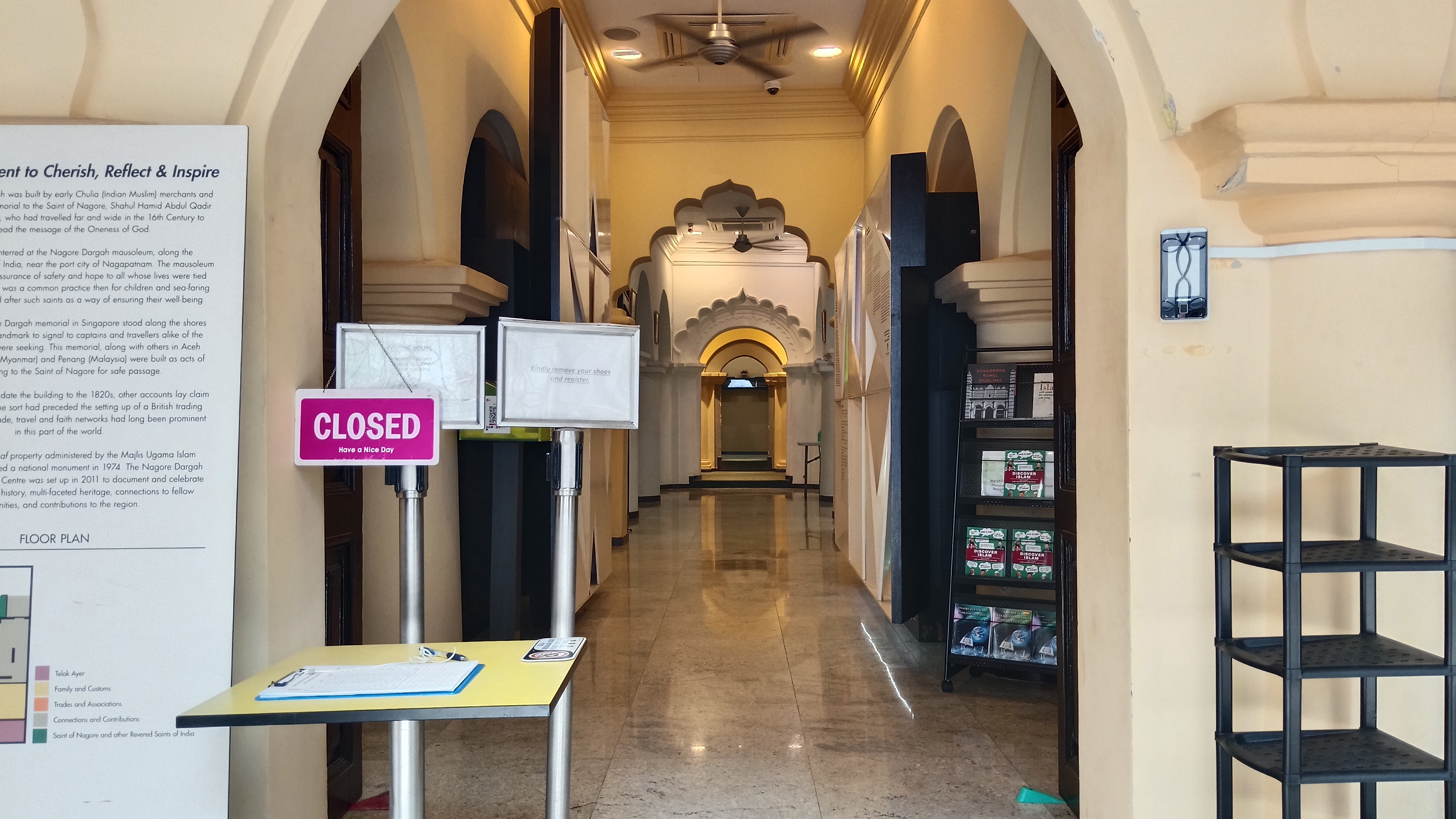
The interior of the Nagore Shrine during closing hours.

== Transportation ==
Due to its location on Telok Ayer Street, the Nagore Durgha is adjacent to other religious national monuments such as Masjid Al-Abrar and the Thian Hock Keng Temple, all of which are directly accessible from the Telok Ayer MRT station on the Downtown Line.

== See also ==
- Islam in Singapore
