= Five-foot way =

Roofed walkways found in Malaysia, Singapore, and Indonesia

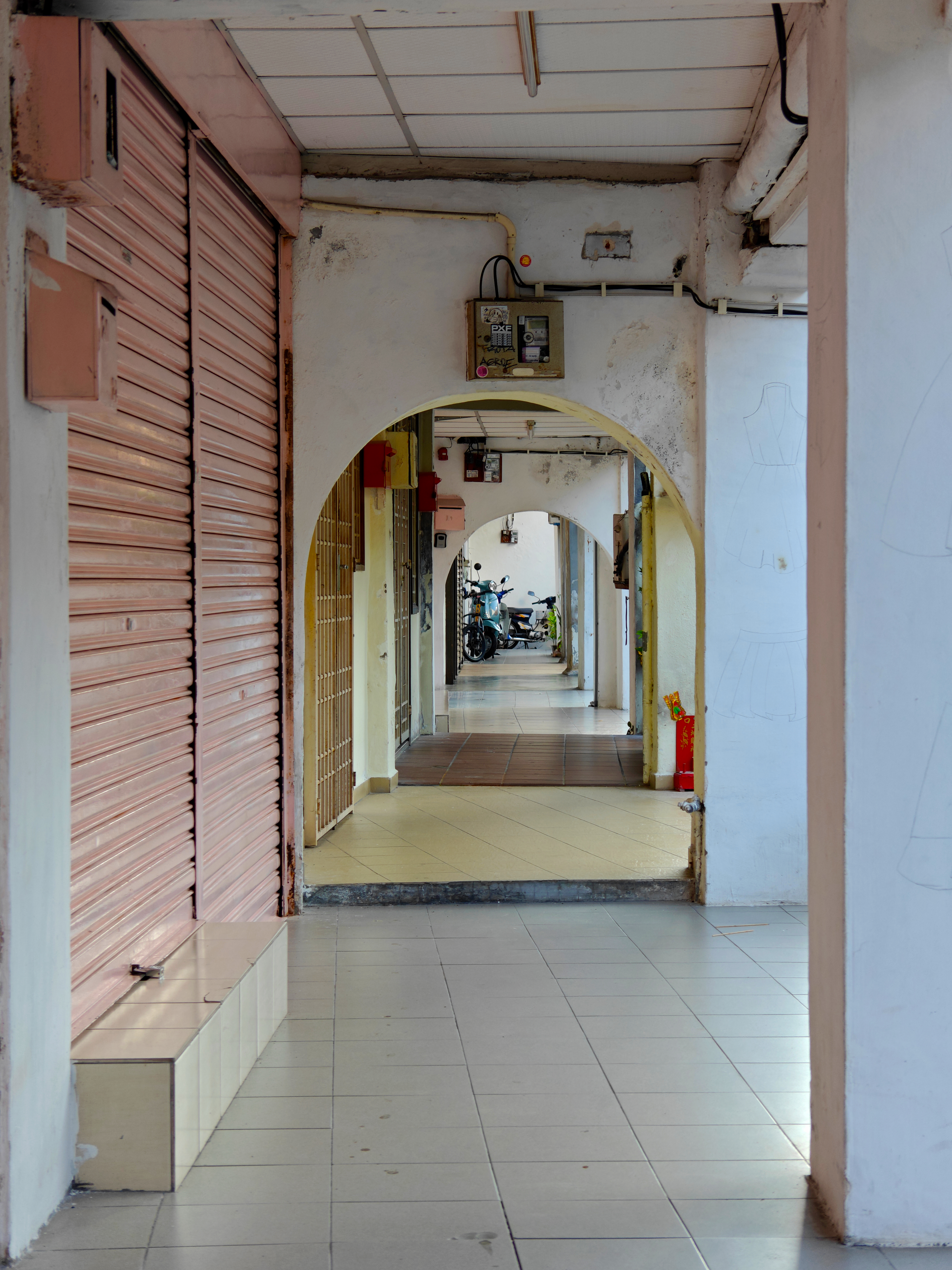
A five-foot way in George Town, Penang, Malaysia

A five-foot way (Malay/Indonesian: kaki lima) is a roofed continuous walkway commonly found in front of shops in Malaysia, Singapore, and Indonesia which may also be used for commercial activity. The name refers to the width of the passageway, but a five-foot way may be narrower or wider than 5 feet (1.5 m). Although it looks like European arcade along the streets, it is a building feature that suits the local climate, and characterizes the town-scape and urban life of this region. It may also be found in parts of Thailand, Taiwan, and Southern China. The term might be translated into Hokkien as ngó͘-kha-ki (五脚基); it is also called têng-á-kha (亭子脚).

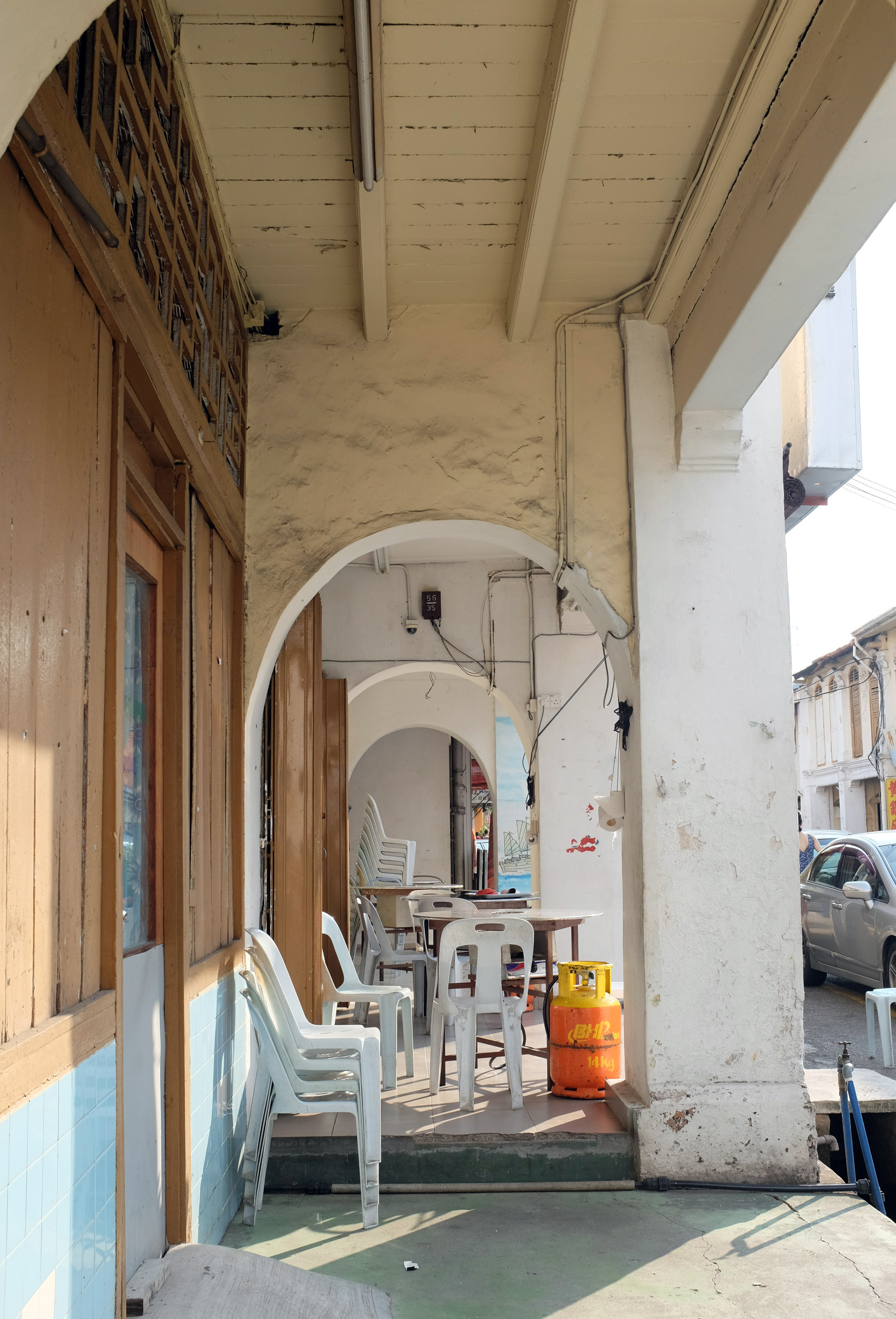
A five-foot way in Malacca, Malaysia

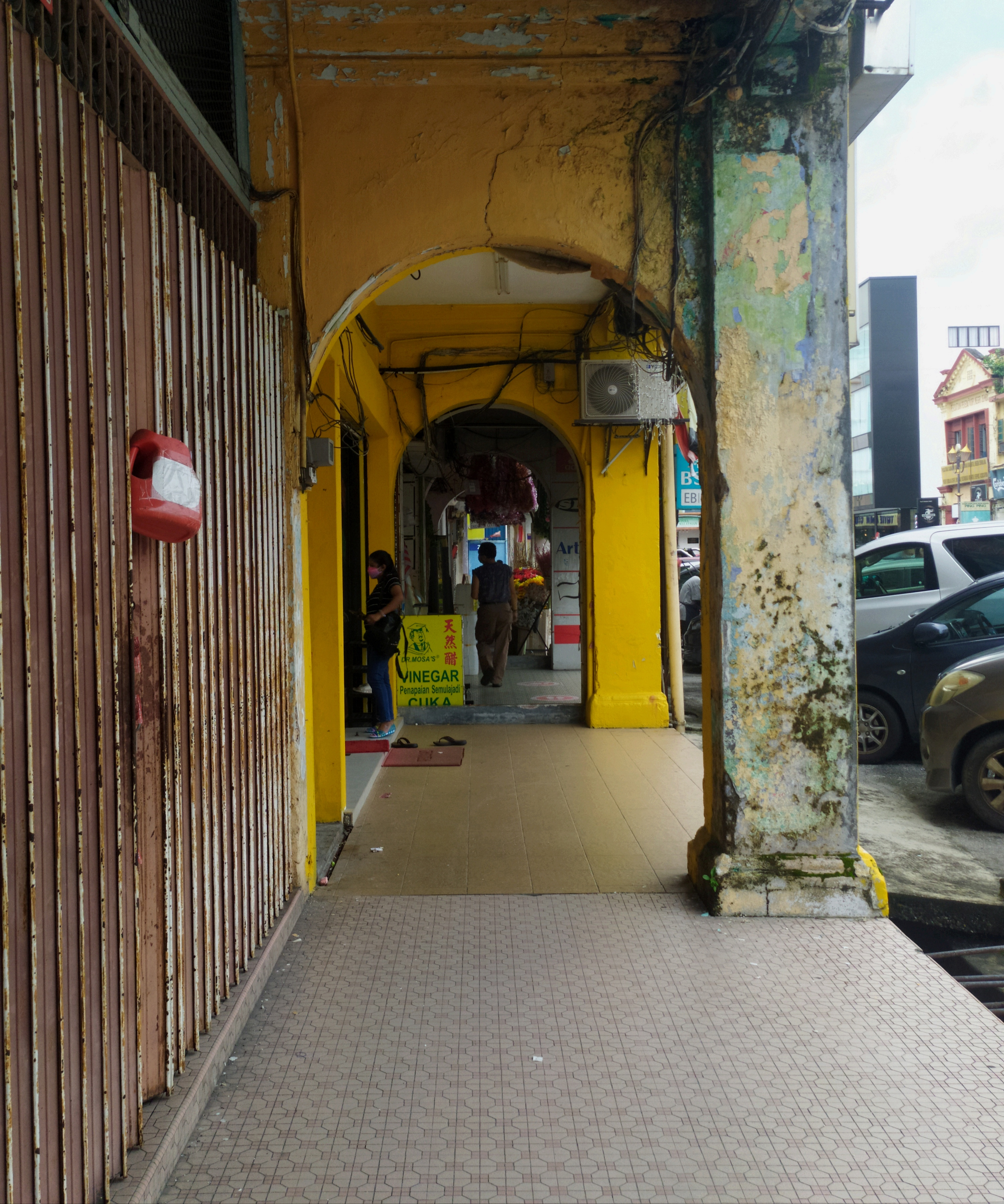
Five-foot way in Seremban, Negeri Sembilan, Malaysia.

The overhanging canopy, roof extension or projected upper floor on top of the five-foot ways provides a cover to shield pedestrians from the sun and the rain. As the ground floor of most commercial buildings in downtown areas is occupied by shops or eating places, the five-foot ways also function as corridors for people to window shop or look for refreshment. These corridors were used by traders to set up various small businesses in the past, and are still used this way in many countries.

== History ==
The requirement for arcades in urban plans may be found as early as 1573 in the Royal Ordinances by Philip II of Spain.

=== Batavia ===
Batavia (now Jakarta) became a capital of the Dutch East India Company in the early 17th century. As soon as Jan Pieterszoon Coen, Governor-General of the Dutch East India Company (VOC) occupied the port town of Jayakarta, he started construction following European fashion. In the middle of the 17th century, Johan Nieuhof, described how two market buildings run parallel with central galleries. Nieuhof further mentioned that the building were divided into 'five walks' or galleries. It has been speculated that the 'five walks' are the kaki lima, referring to the space rather than the width of the passage'.

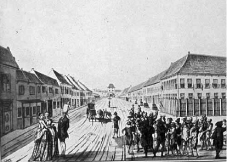
Batavia street-scape illustrated in c.1760.

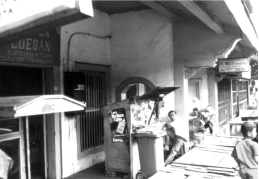
Kaki lima in Kota, Jakarta, c.1990.

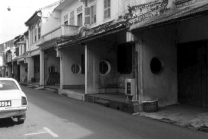
Kaki lima in Melaka, c.1990.

When the British East India Company (EIC) ruled the Dutch East Indies during the Napoleonic War, Thomas Stamford Raffles was appointed the Lieutenant-Governor of the Dutch East Indies in 1811–1815. Raffles was in Batavia in 1811–1815 as governor during the British Java period and may have observed the verandahs, footways and continuous eaves of Batavia. It has been claimed that Raffles ordered the construction of walkways of around five feet wide in front of shops in Batavia.

=== Singapore ===
Raffles founded modern Singapore in 1819, and that is where the five-foot way became firmly established as an architectural feature of the region. He included this and other details in his Town Plan of 1822. Raffles issued a set of instructions on how the new colony may be organised in his plan for Singapore in 1822. He stipulated that the buildings in the newly established colony should be uniform and should be built of brick and tiles to reduce fire risks. He added:

... a still further accommodation will be afforded to the public by requiring that each house should have a verandah of certain depth, open at all times as a continued and covered passage on each side of the street.

This became the five-foot way, and this feature of shophouses in Singapore was observable by the 1840s from the drawings of surveyor and engineer John Turnbull Thomson. The land leaseholder had to provide public walkways of certain width in front of their shops and houses. As they constructed the second floor above the public walkways, it formed roofed continuous walkways along the street. Although it was planned as a public walkway, the five-foot way would also become a place for hawkers to trade, and it was used as retail, storage, and even living spaces. Attempts in Singapore to clear the walkways of hawkers who were obstructing the walkway in the 1880s led to the so-called Verandah Riots.

British traveller Isabella Bird provided a vivid description of the bustling local five-footway, offering a rare perspective from the late 19th century:

... more interesting still are the bazaars or continuous rows of open shops which create for themselves a perpetual twilight by hanging tatties or other screens outside the sidewalks, forming long shady alleys, in which crowds of buyers and sellers chaffer over their goods ...

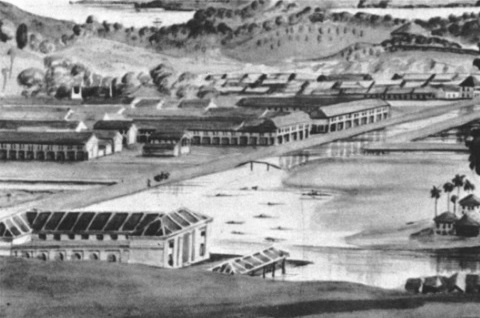
View of Singapore c.1845, shophouses with arcades can be seen in this drawing by John Turnbull Thomson

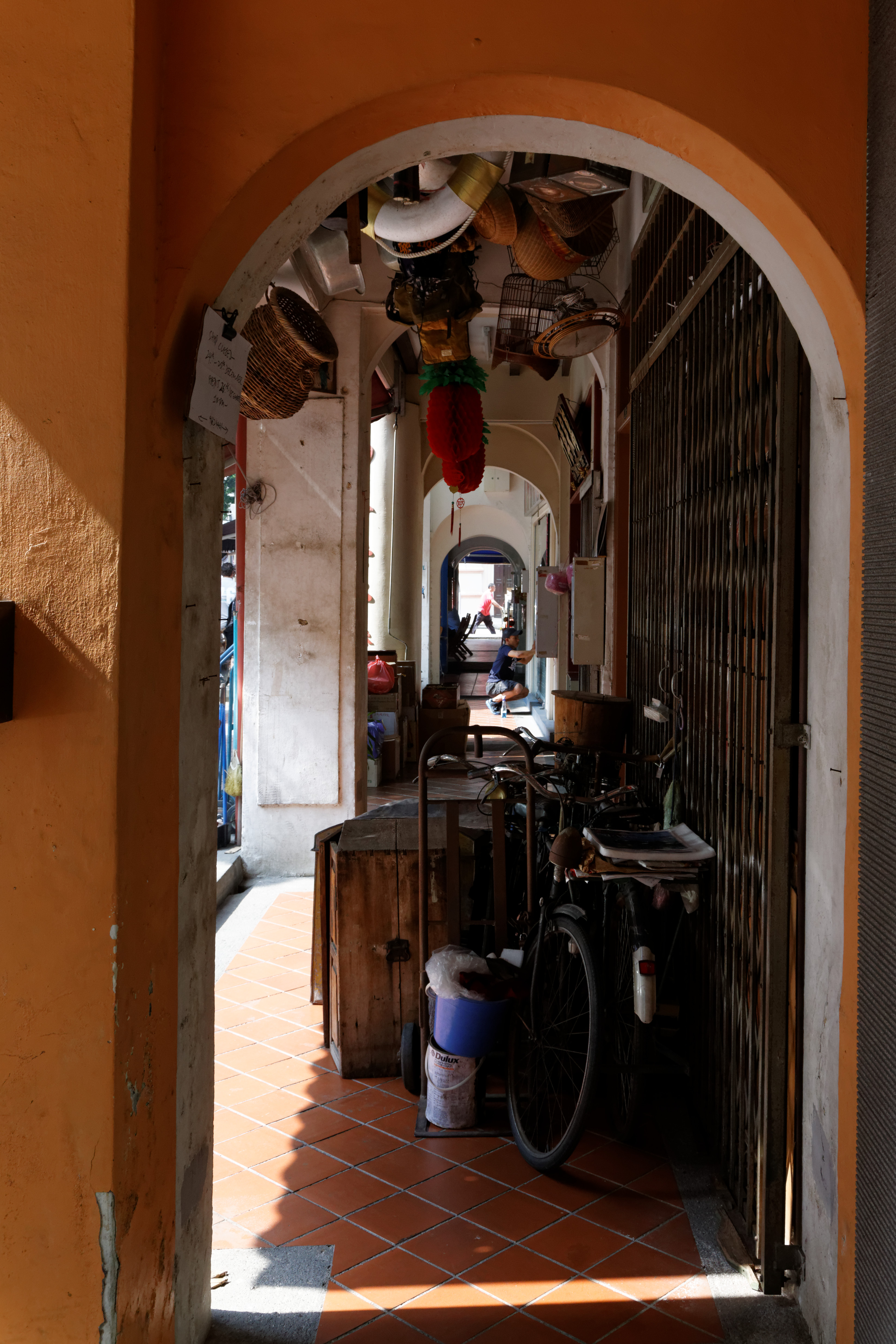
A five-foot way in Singapore

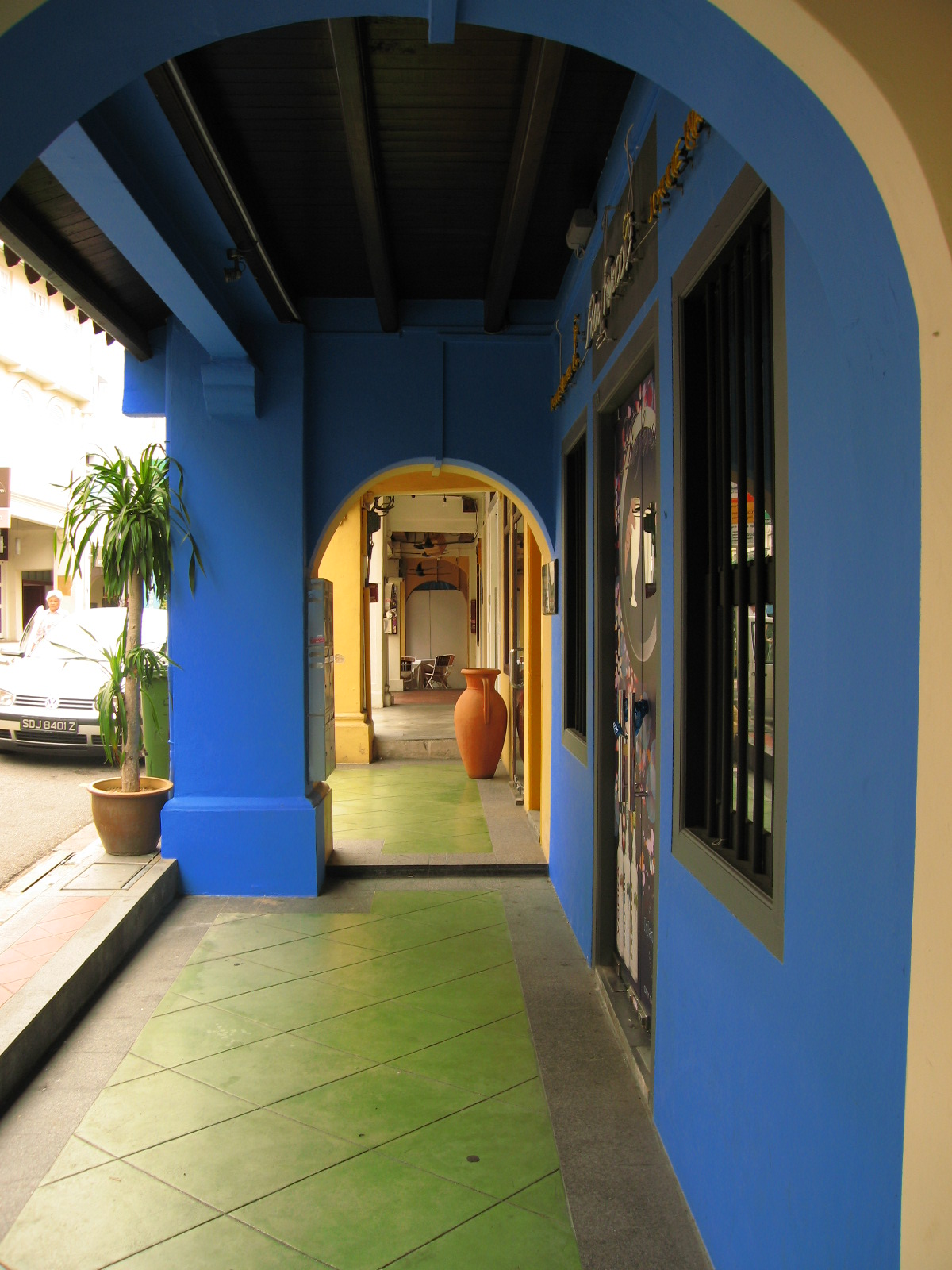
A five-foot way in Singapore

=== Other Straits Settlements ===
Ordinances and by-laws requiring such verandah walkways were then enacted from the mid-19th and early 20th century in the Straits Settlements and Malayan towns, for example, the 1884 building by-laws introduced by Frank Swettenham in the rebuilding of Kuala Lumpur provided for the inclusion of 5-foot passageways beside the road. However, the term "five-foot way" was not specifically mentioned in such ordinances and by-laws, rather words as arcade, verandah or verandah-way or five-foot-path were used. The term may have been coined by builders in response to the minimum width of the walkway. The walkway would become an integral feature of many settlements in neighbouring British colonies in the Malaya peninsula, and by the later half of the 19th century became a feature of the distinctive "Strait Settlement Style" buildings. It is still commonly found in the towns and cities of Malaysia. Although it was originally a feature colonial-era buildings, many buildings in the post-colonial era in Malaysia still incorporated a sheltered walkway, although not necessarily in the form of an arcade.

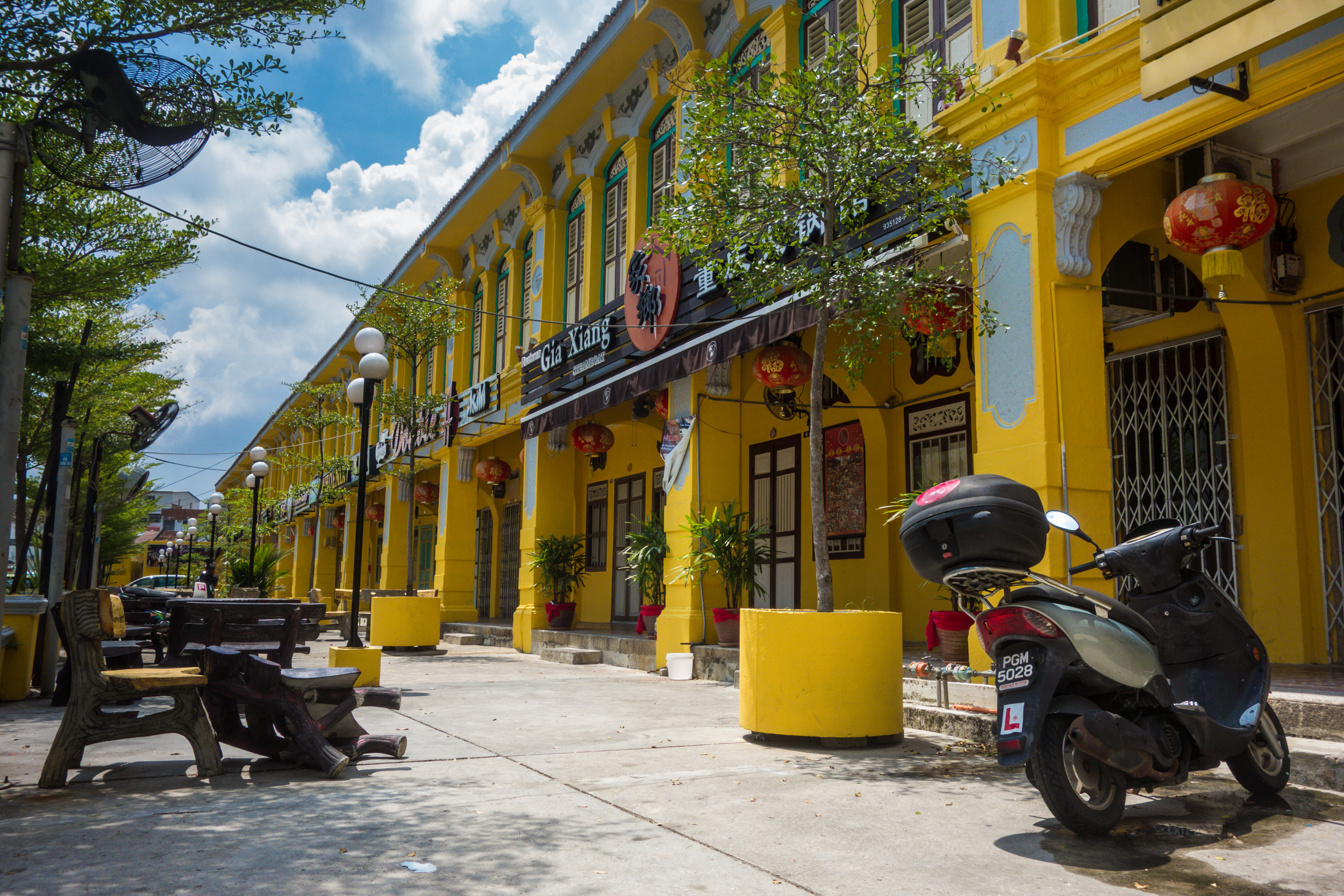
Shophouses in Penang with a five-foot way

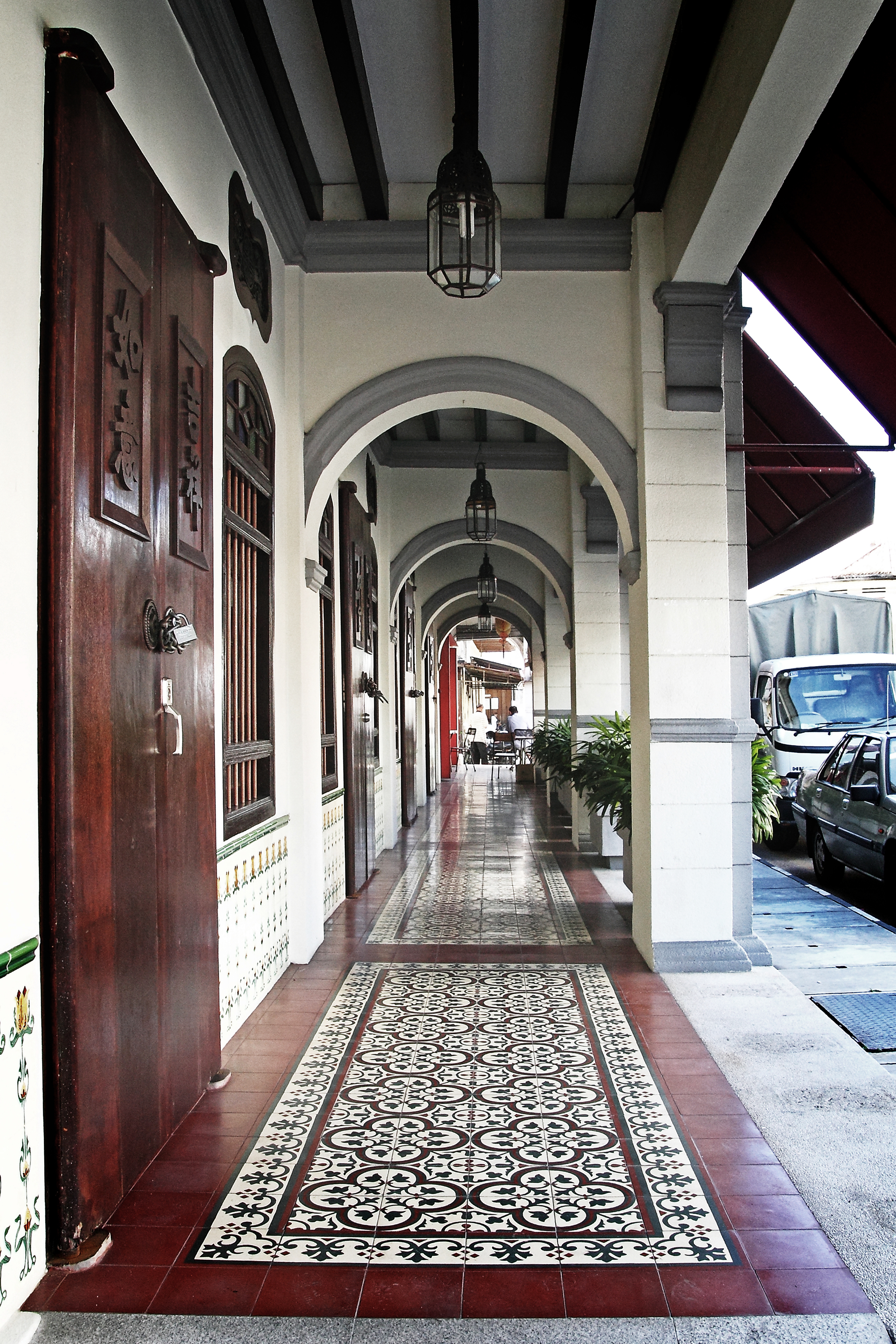
A tiled five-foot way in Penang

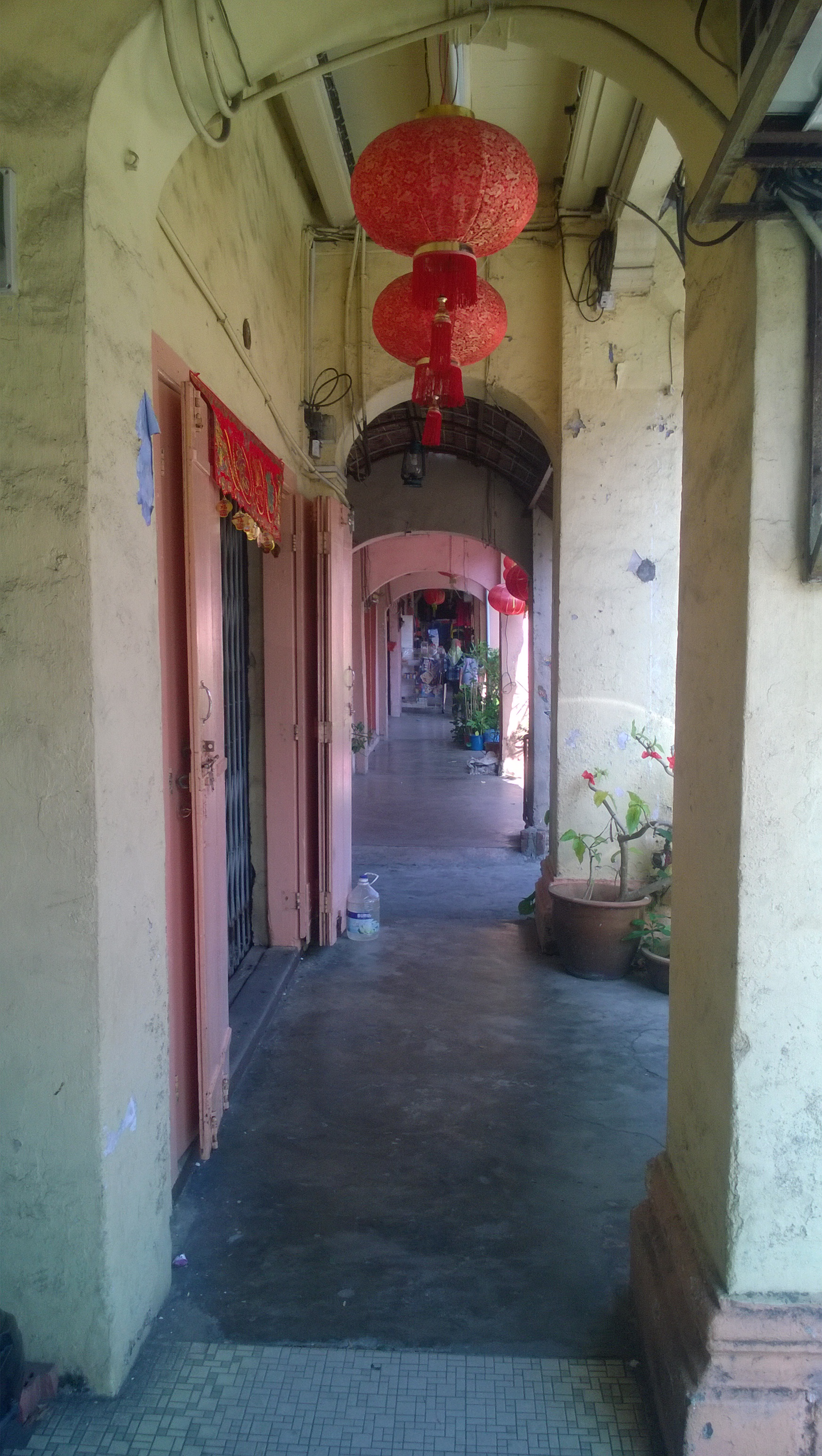
A five-foot way in Kuala Trengganu, Malaysia

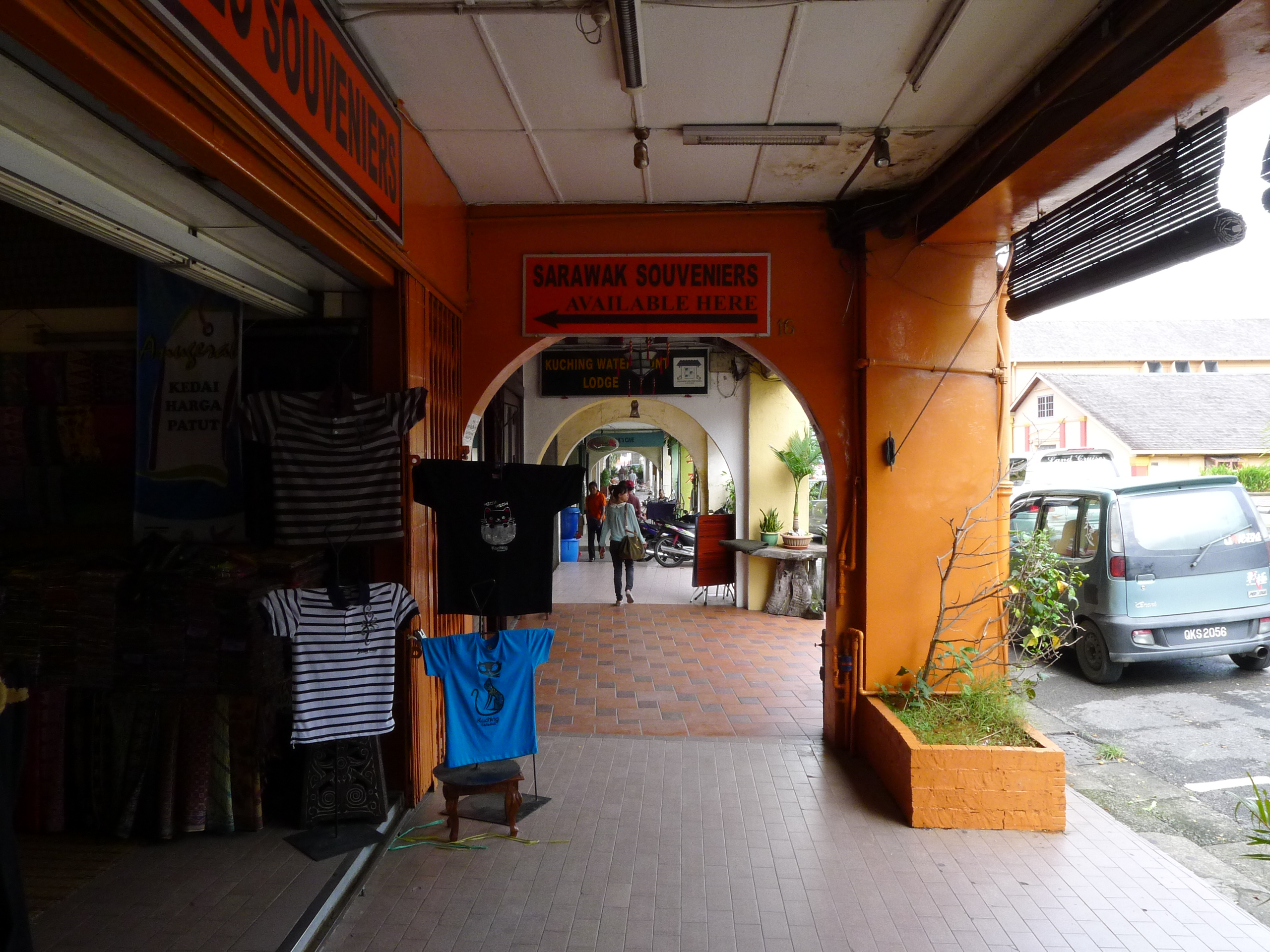
A five-foot way in Kuching, Sarawak

=== Southern China, Taiwan and Hong Kong Colony ===
The Five Foot Way or Verandah regulation was also applied for town planning in Taiwan in the late 19th century and in South China in early 20th century under the Republic of China. The verandah may be found as the qilou (arcade) of these regions. In the early colonial period of Hong Kong, any construction and projection was not allowed above the public walkways, but the colonial government issued "the Verandah Regulation" in 1878 to enable adjacent land leaseholder to build overhanging second floor above the walkways to cope with the lack of living space.

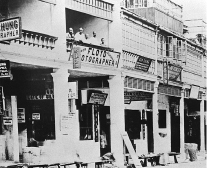
Verandah in Hong Kong Colony, c. 1890.

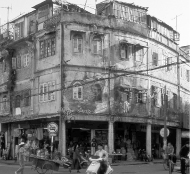
Qílóu in Guanzhou, c. 1990.

=== Southeast Asia ===
This architectural feature also spread to other South East Asian countries, such as Thailand, the Philippines, Brunei, and Burma after the mid-19th century. Such feature may have been introduced to Bangkok after the visit of Rama V to Singapore in 1871, while towns in southern Thailand were influenced by their proximity to Malaya.

It remains a prominent element in the architecture in Singapore and Malaysia.

== Communal five-foot way ==
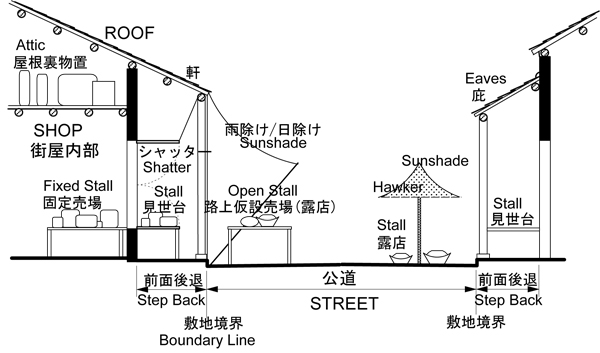
Various Kaki Limas: Hawker, stall and shop under eaves

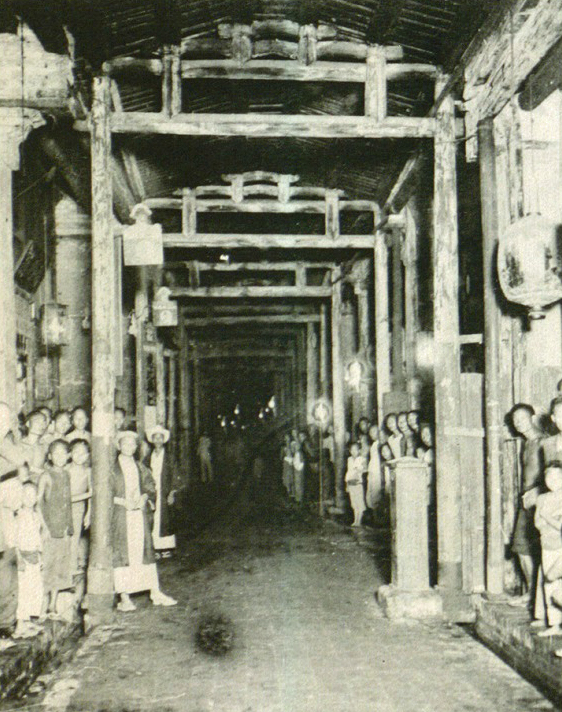
Roofed Walkway in Lukang, Taiwan, c.1900.

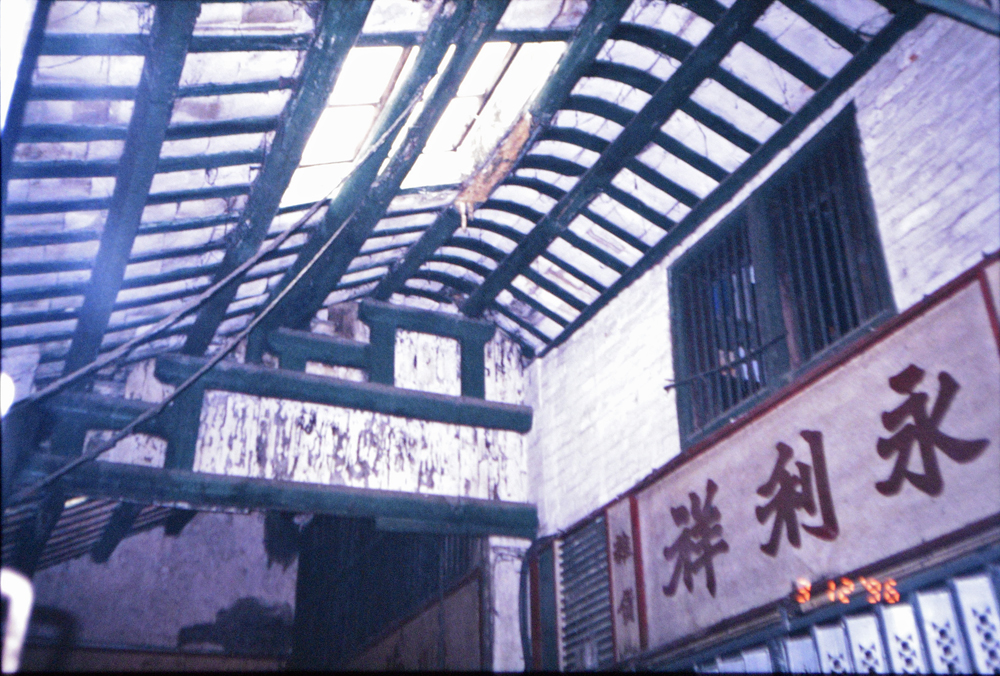
Roofed Walkway in Peng-Chau, Hong Kong, 1996.

== Kaki Lima in Indonesia ==
The Indonesian usage of kaki lima is interchangeable with trotoar (from French via Dutch: trottoir), as both refer to walking paths or sidewalks. In Indonesian, the colloquial term pedagang kaki lima references street hawkers that often occupy the five-foot ways. The Kaki Lima in Indonesia historically offered a potpourri of goods such as shirts, socks, blouses, pots and pans. Nowadays, they are often occupied by small eateries and stands.

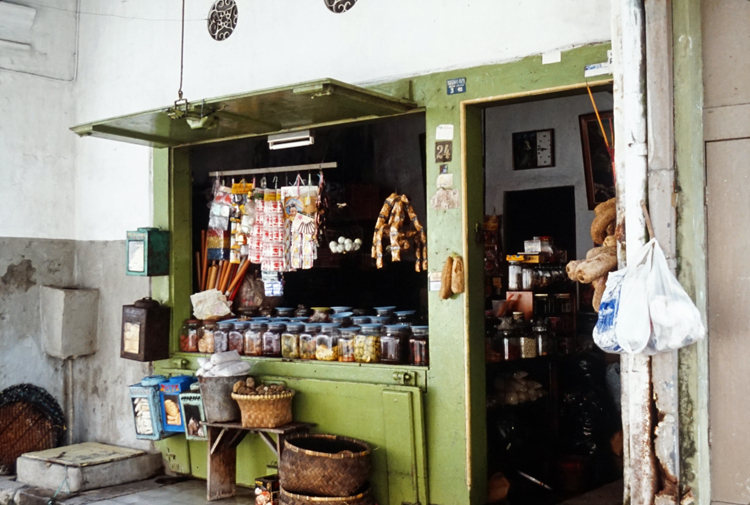
Kaki Lima in Pecinan, Semarang, 1991.

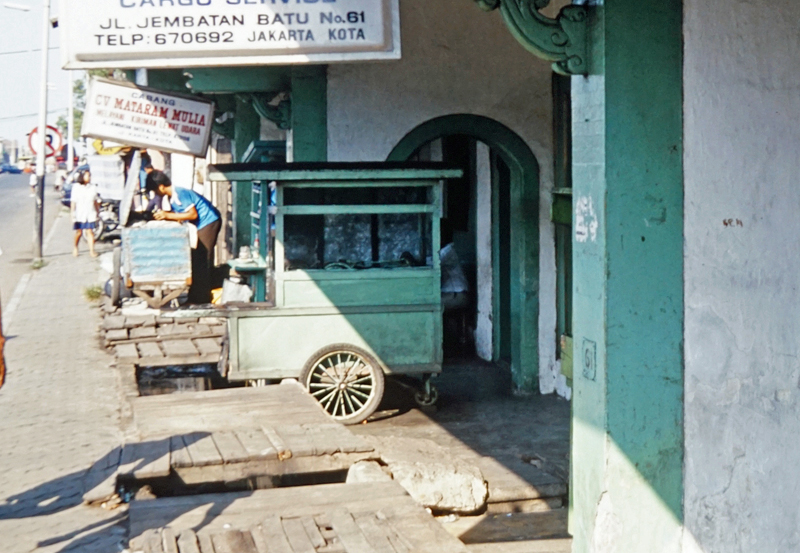
Two Wheels Kaki Lima in Kota, Jakarta, 1990.

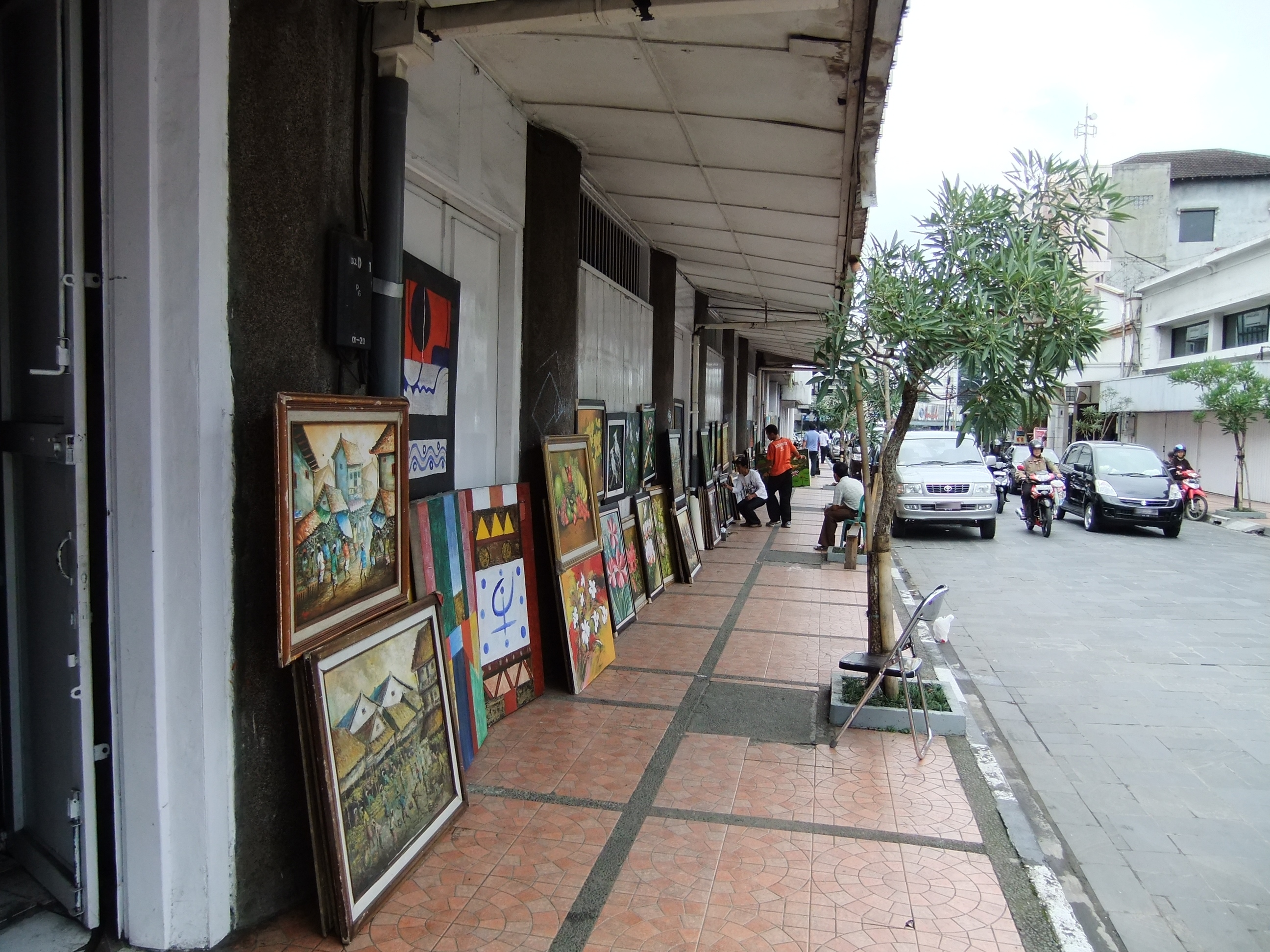
Kaki lima or five-foot way along Braga Street in Bandung, Indonesia, occupied by street artist selling paintings

== See also ==
- Overhang (architecture)
- Portico
- Verandah
- Tong lau
