= Masjid Jamae =

Historic mosque in Chinatown, Singapore

Jamae Mosque Periya Paḷḷi (பெரிய பள்ளி) Zhān Měi Huí Jiào Táng (詹美回教堂)

- Location in Singapore

Religion
- Affiliation: Sunni Islam

Location
- Location: 218 South Bridge Road, Singapore 058767
- Country: Singapore
- Coordinates: 1.2831179°N 103.8454107°E

Architecture
- Type: Congregational mosque
- Style: Eclectic
- Founder: Anṣār Ṣāib
- Established: 1826
- Completed: 1830s
- Minaret: 2
- Designated as NHL

National monument of Singapore
- Designated: 19 November 1974; 51 years ago
- Reference no.: 13

The Jamae Mosque (Malay: Masjid Jamae, Jawi: مسجد جامعة, Tamil: மஸ்ஜித் ஜாமிஆ, romanized: Masjit Jāmi'ā, Chinese: 詹美回教堂) is a historic congregational mosque located along South Bridge Road in Chinatown, Singapore. Built in the 1830s by immigrants from South India, it features an eclectic architectural style. The Jamae Mosque is one of the earliest Indian Muslim mosques in the country and was gazetted as a national monument of Singapore in 1974.

== Etymology ==
The word "Jamae" in the name of the mosque is a localization of the Arabic word jami' which refers to congregational mosques. The Tamil language name of the mosque is Periya Paḷḷi, which literally means "big mosque" and reflects its status as the largest mosque in the Chinatown area.

== History ==
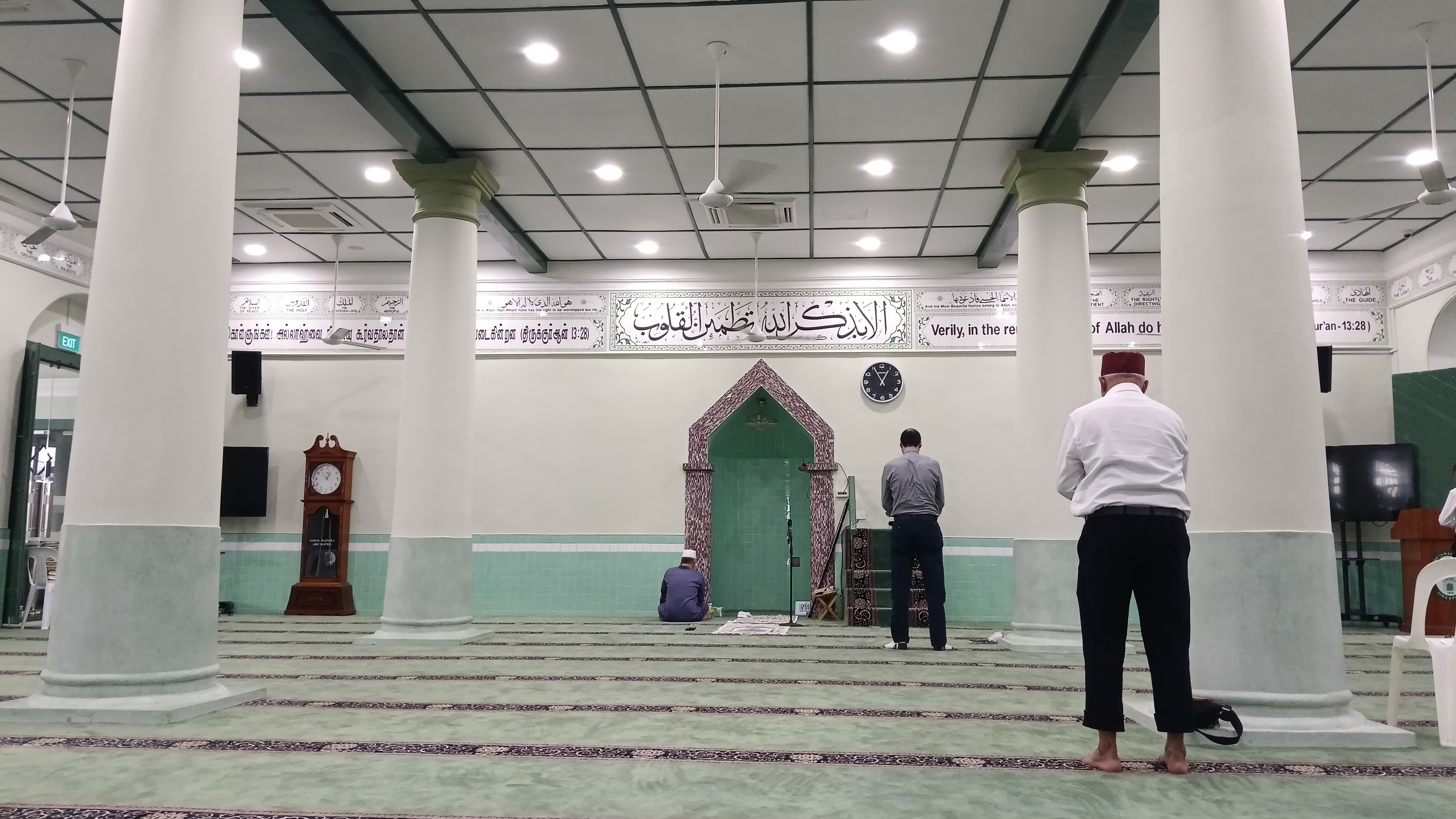
Worshippers inside the main prayer hall of the Jamae Mosque in 2026.

One of the first Indian Muslim mosques in the country, the Jamae Mosque was established in 1827 by a group of South Indian immigrants adherent to Sunni Islam, known as the Chulias. The committee of this establishment was led by a man named Anṣār Ṣāib, who is credited with being the founder of the mosque. Construction on the Jamae Mosque was ultimately completed between 1830 and 1835. The trustees of the mosque were appointed in 1894, with their jurisdiction later extended to the Al-Abrar Mosque along Telok Ayer Street, before the ownership of both buildings was acquired by the Muslim and Hindu Endowments Board in 1914. After the independence of Singapore, management of the Jamae Mosque fell under the purview of the Majlis Ugama Islam Singapura (MUIS).

The Jamae Mosque was gazetted as a national monument of Singapore on 19 November 1974 by the National Heritage Board. The mosque was also extensively renovated in 2024, which involved the improvisation of elderly-oriented features, as well as the addition of a new madrasa into the mosque compound and the exterior of the mosque being repainted.

== Architecture ==
The Jamae Mosque displays eclecticism in architecture, combining European architecture with local styles. The entrance of the mosque facing South Bridge Road takes the form of a gatehouse that is South Indian in appearance and flanked by two decorative minarets that are each topped by a small cupola. The main building of the mosque is an ancillary hall, built in an Indo-Saracenic style, while the pillars supporting the roof take the form of Doric columns and the windows that are adorned with glazed grilleworks in a local Chinese style. The main ablution area for worshippers can be found directly outside the ancillary hall.

The cenotaph marking the spot of the former grave of Muhammad Salih.

In a compound behind the mosque is a small shrine and mausoleum dedicated to a Muslim sage named Muhammad Salih. It was formerly part of a small cemetery in the mosque, until the burying ground was exhumed in the early 2000s, leaving only the empty cenotaph of the sage. This memorial building is designed in a style that is uniform to the main mosque building and remains a prominently visited site by both locals and tourists. It is also placed in a corner of the rear courtyard and not behind the qibla in accordance with Islamic customs that prevent the graves being located in the direction of prayer, while behind it is a small guest house for important visitors.

The mosque is sandwiched by Mosque Street to the north and Pagoda Street to the south. The former is also named after the mosque after it was built in the 1830s. A grand entrance to the Jamae Mosque which faced Mosque Street once existed in the 1850s, although this entrance was removed at an unknown period of time. There is, however, still an entrance to the mosque via Mosque Street, although it takes the form of a simple metal doorway and has been boarded up.

== Transportation ==
The Jamae Mosque is within walking distance from the Chinatown MRT station that serves both the North–East Line and the Downtown Line.

== See also ==
- Islam in Singapore
- List of mosques in Singapore
