= Bendemeer (disambiguation) =

Bendemeer may refer to:

- Bendemeer, New South Wales, Australia
- Bendemeer, Singapore
- Bendemeer MRT station, Mass Rapid Transit station in Singapore
- Bendemeer House, Former residence of Chinese merchant Hoo Ah Kay

== See also ==
- Shire of Bendemere, Local government area in Queensland, Australia
- Bendemeer white gum
