= 34 Whampoa West =

Flat in Singapore

Coordinates: 1.3205°N 103.8612°E

Block 34 Whampoa West is an HDB block in Bendemeer, Singapore. The block is the third longest surviving HDB block, behind 121 Paya Lebar Way and 195 Kim Keat Avenue, being 311.5 metres long.

== History ==
Block 34 Whampoa West was completed on 1 January 1972. The building was built on the former grounds of the Bendemeer House, the former residence of Chinese merchant Hoo Ah Kay, commonly known as Whampoa. The block was originally painted entirely white, and curves along the road Whampoa West. The block is about 312–320 metres long, and consists of nearly 500 units. The first floor of the building is occupied by shops. The unique circular shape of the block established it as a local landmark, and the length of the building made it one of the longest HDB blocks. The block also has the longest continuous corridor in Singapore.

The building was featured on a stamp released in 2020.
