= New Bridge Road =

Road in central Singapore

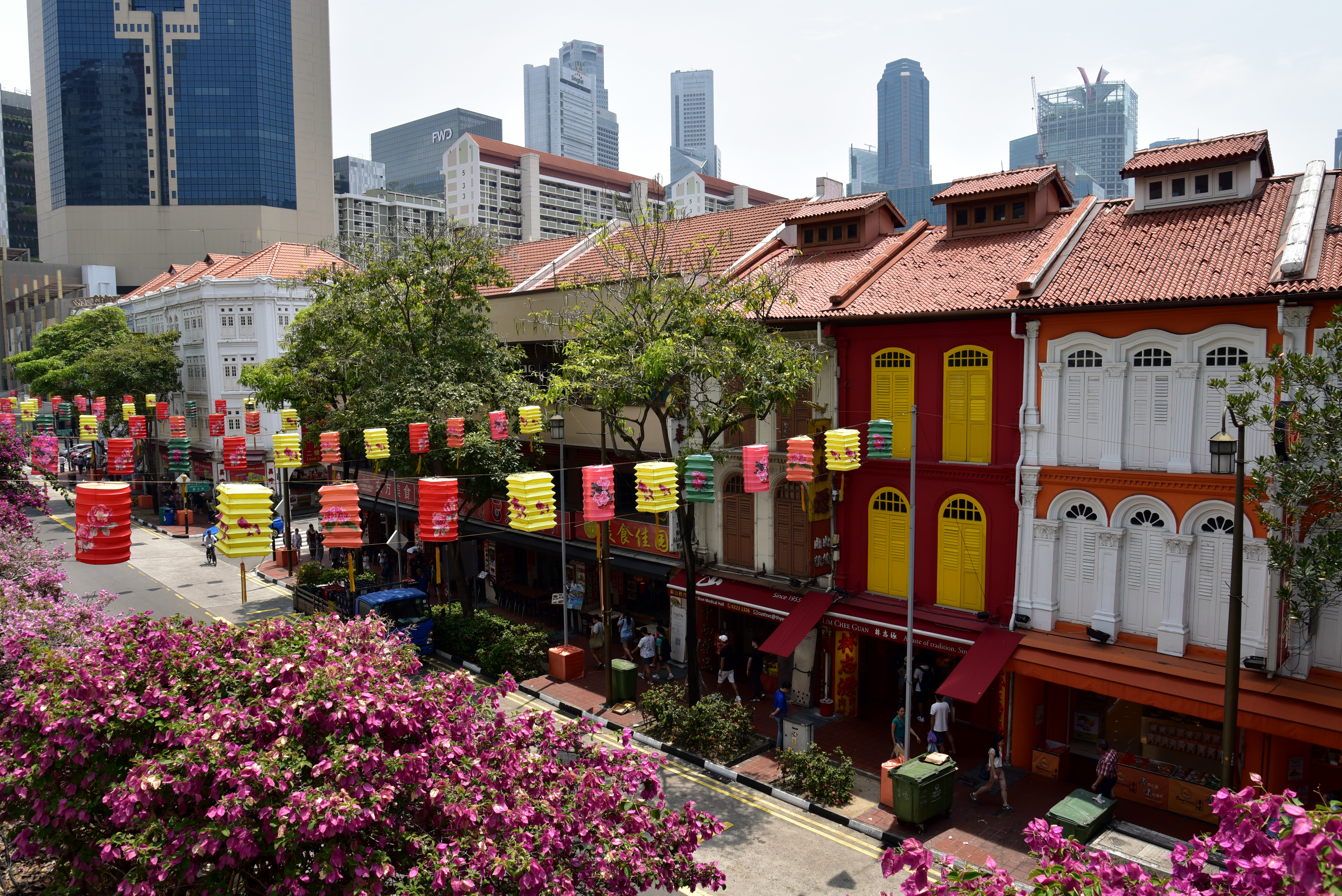
- A row of shophouses on New Bridge Road.

Route information
- Existed: 1842–present

Major junctions
- Northern end: Coleman Bridge
- Southern end: Kampong Bahru Road

Location
- Country: Singapore

Highway system
- Transport in Singapore

New Bridge Road (Chinese: 新桥路; Malay: Jalan Jambatan Baharu) is a major one-way road located within the Central Area in Singapore.

New Bridge Road starts at the Coleman Bridge to the south of the Singapore River and extends into Chinatown within the Outram Planning Area, before joining with Eu Tong Sen Street and Kampong Bahru Road within the Bukit Merah Planning Area. The road runs parallel to Eu Tong Sen Street throughout its entire length, but in the opposite direction.

With the opening of the North East Line, there were plans to revert the New Bridge Road portion between Clarke Quay and Upper Cross Street into one-way street in 2003 after 11 years, but this never come to fruition. Today, two stations plies along the stretch - Clarke Quay MRT station and Chinatown MRT station.

== Etymology and history ==
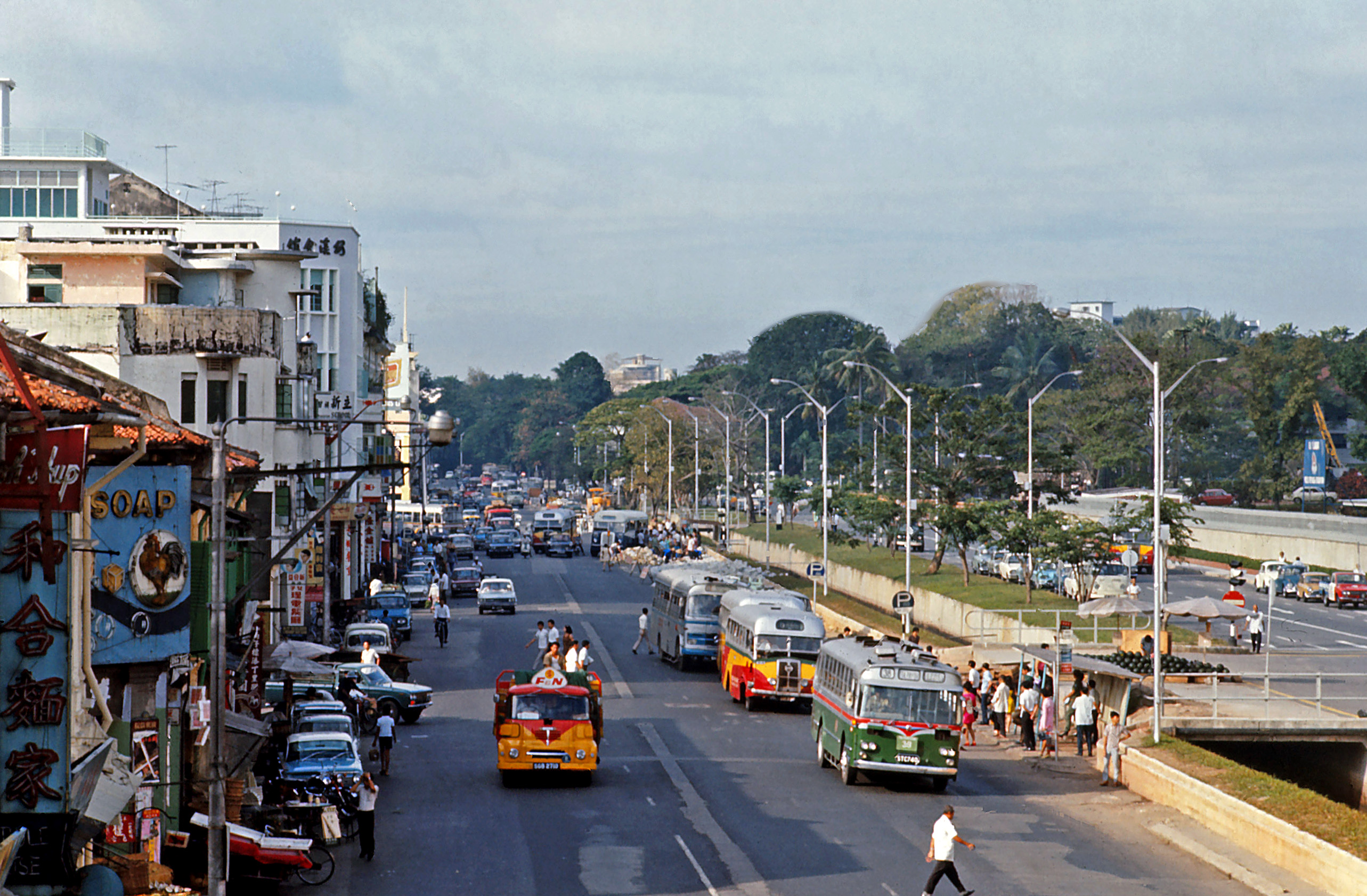
New Bridge Road in 1971

After the completion of the Coleman Bridge over the Singapore River in 1840, New Bridge Road was built in 1842 linked to the bridge on the south bank of the river. It was named as such due to the newly completed bridge connected to it.

In Hokkien, the road was also known as sin pa sat ma chu cheng, meaning "in front of the new market police station", ji ma lo, or "second horse way". In Cantonese, it was also known as Yi-ma-lo, which means “second horse way” also.

The early main business along New Bridge Road and Wayang Street (now defunct and part of Eu Tong Sen Street) was the fruit and vegetable trade by the Teochews. Due to the Singapore River being part of the trading business, New Bridge Road became one of the major trading areas for the Chinese.

== Notable landmarks ==
One of the earliest public parks in Singapore, Dunman's Green, named after the first Superintendent of Police Thomas Dunman, was built along New Bridge Road. In 1876, it was renamed as Hong Lim Green in honour of Cheang Hong Lim, a wealthy Chinese Hokkien businessman and philanthropist who bought and donated the land to the government. Hong Lim Green was then refurbished by the City Council of Singapore with new grass turf, a sand filled children's playground, a fountain, park facilities, and an open-air theatre was built at a cost of S$173,000, it was renamed to Hong Lim Park and officially reopened by S. Rajaratnam on 23 April 1960.

== See also ==
- North Bridge Road
- South Bridge Road
