= Central Area, Singapore =

Central Area

Other transcription(s)
  - Chinese: 中央商业区
  - Malay: Kawasan Tengah
  - Tamil: மத்திய பகுதி
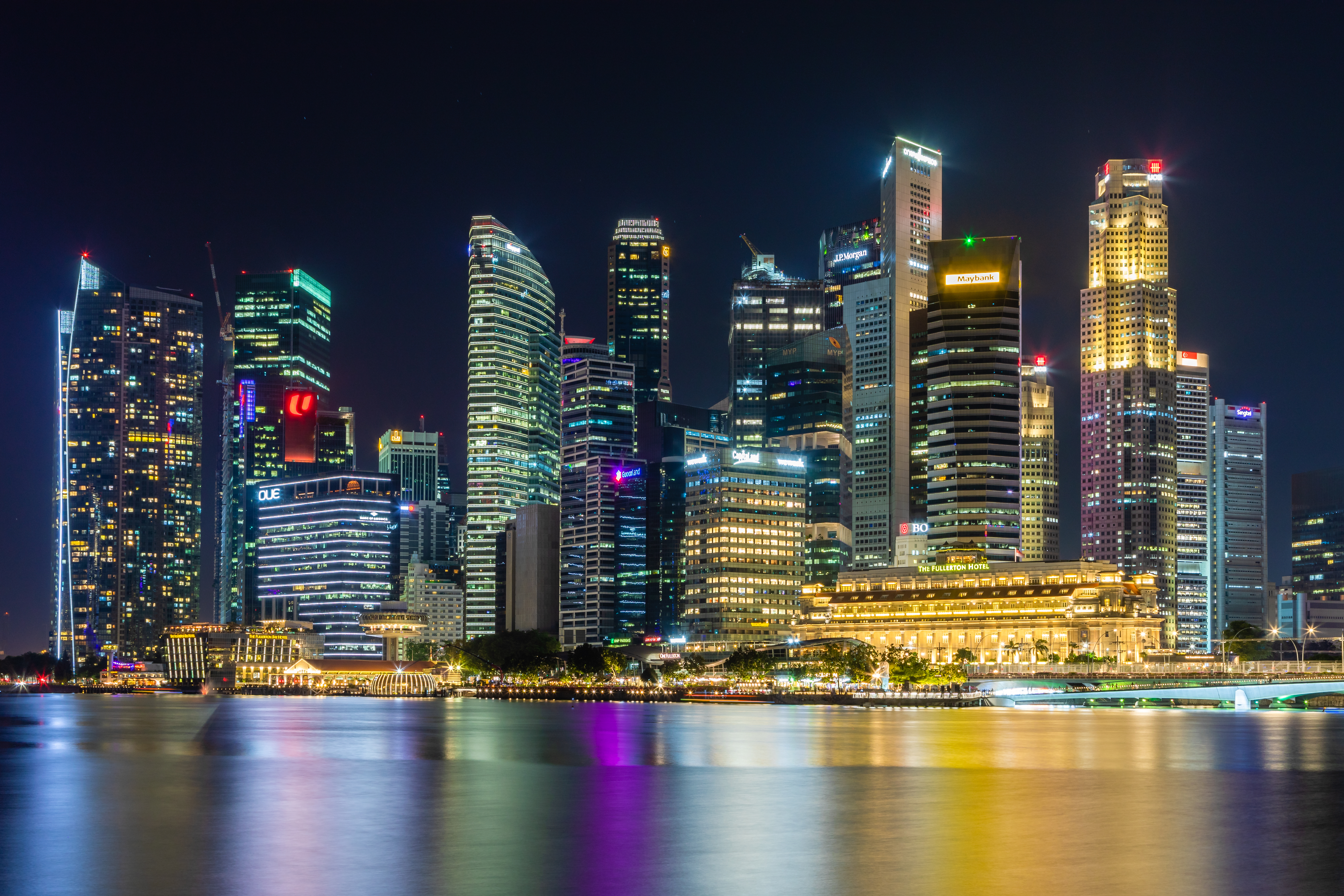
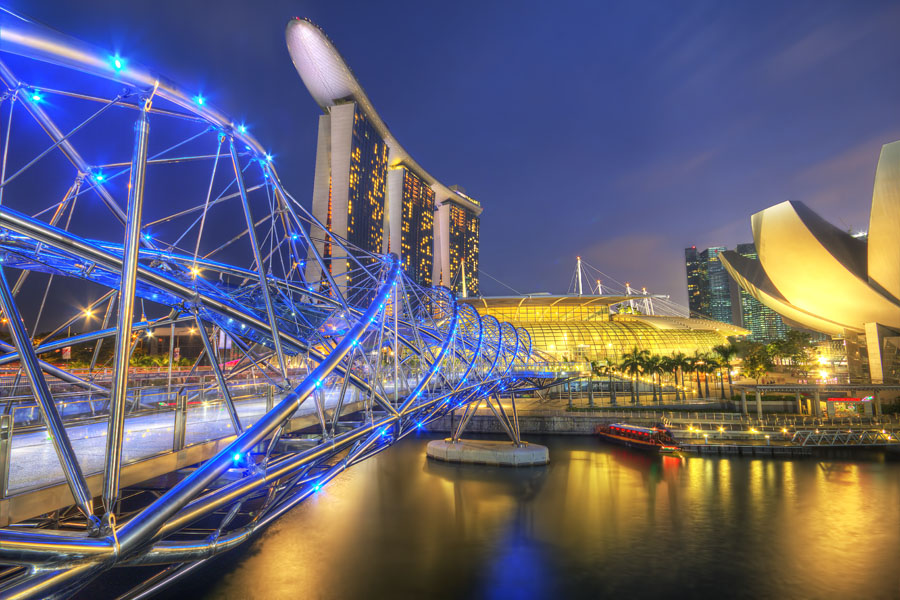
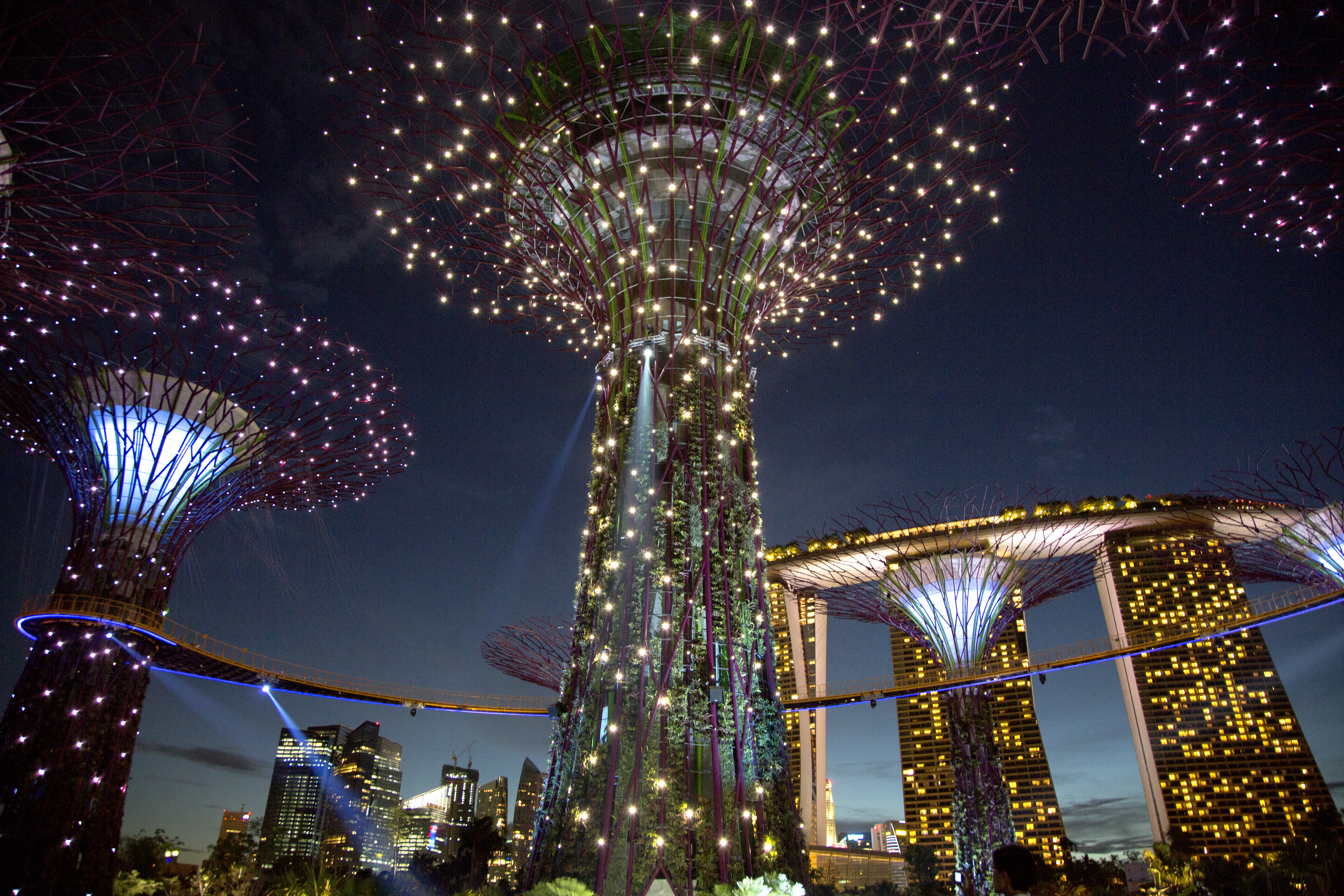
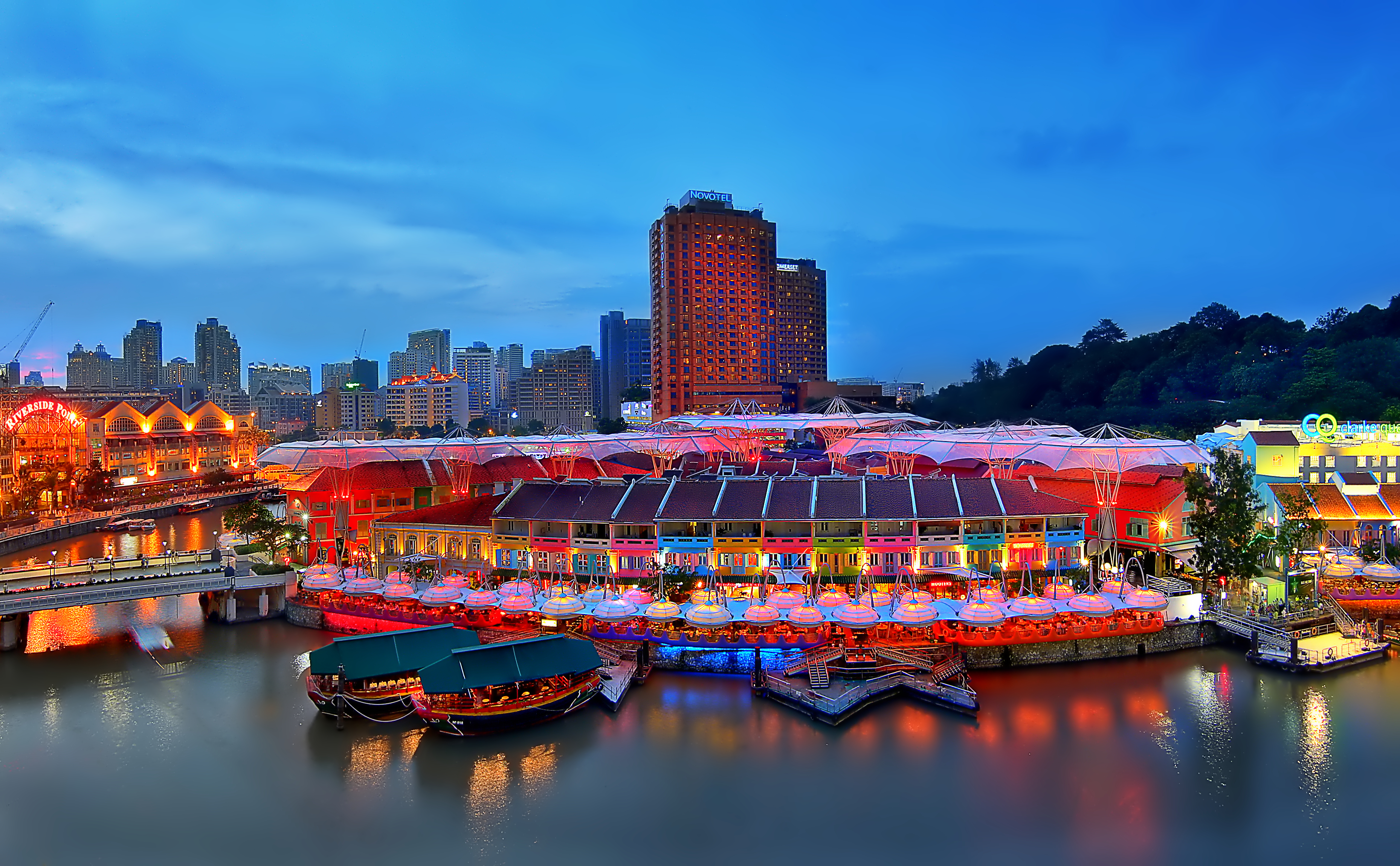
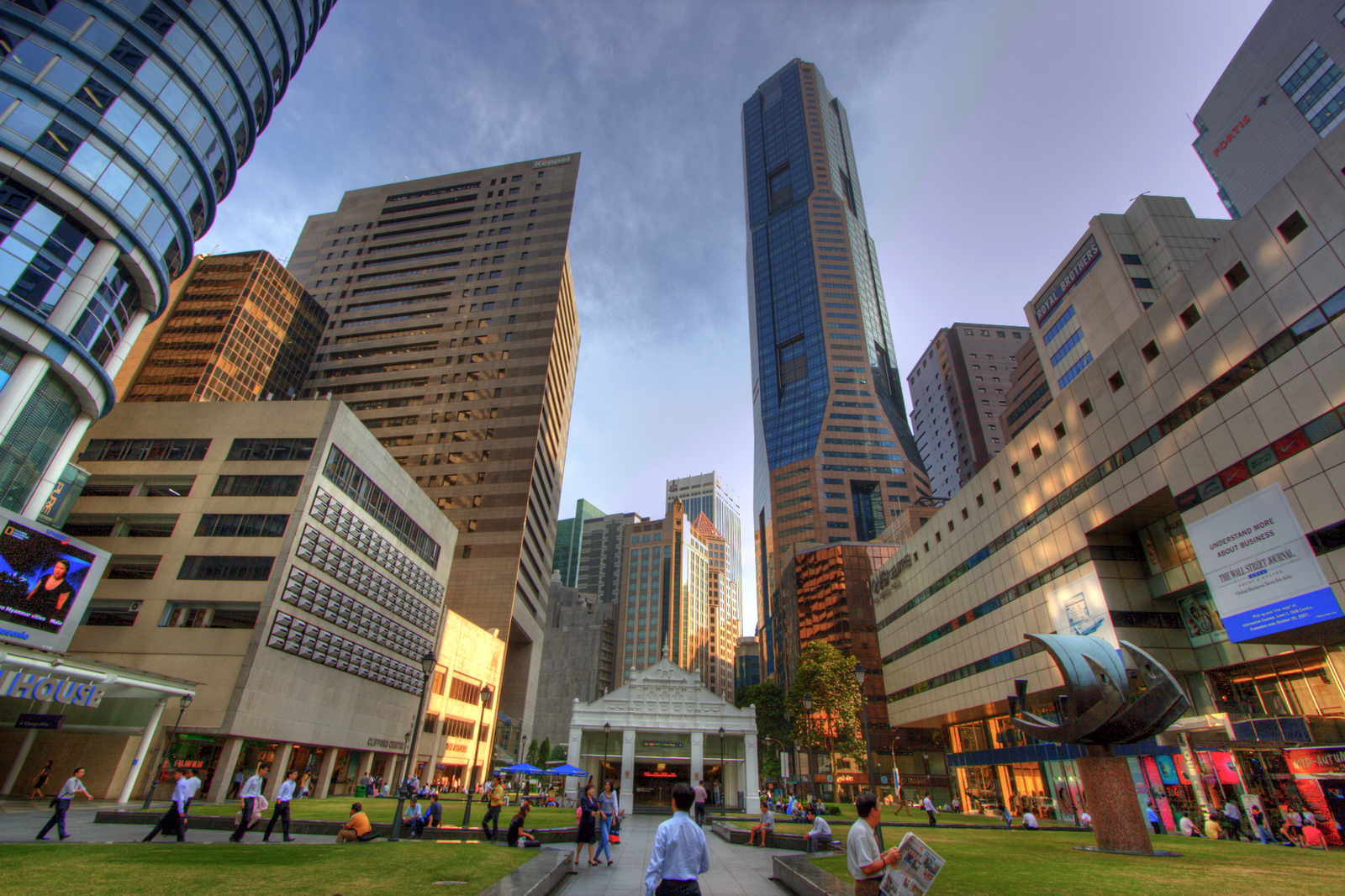
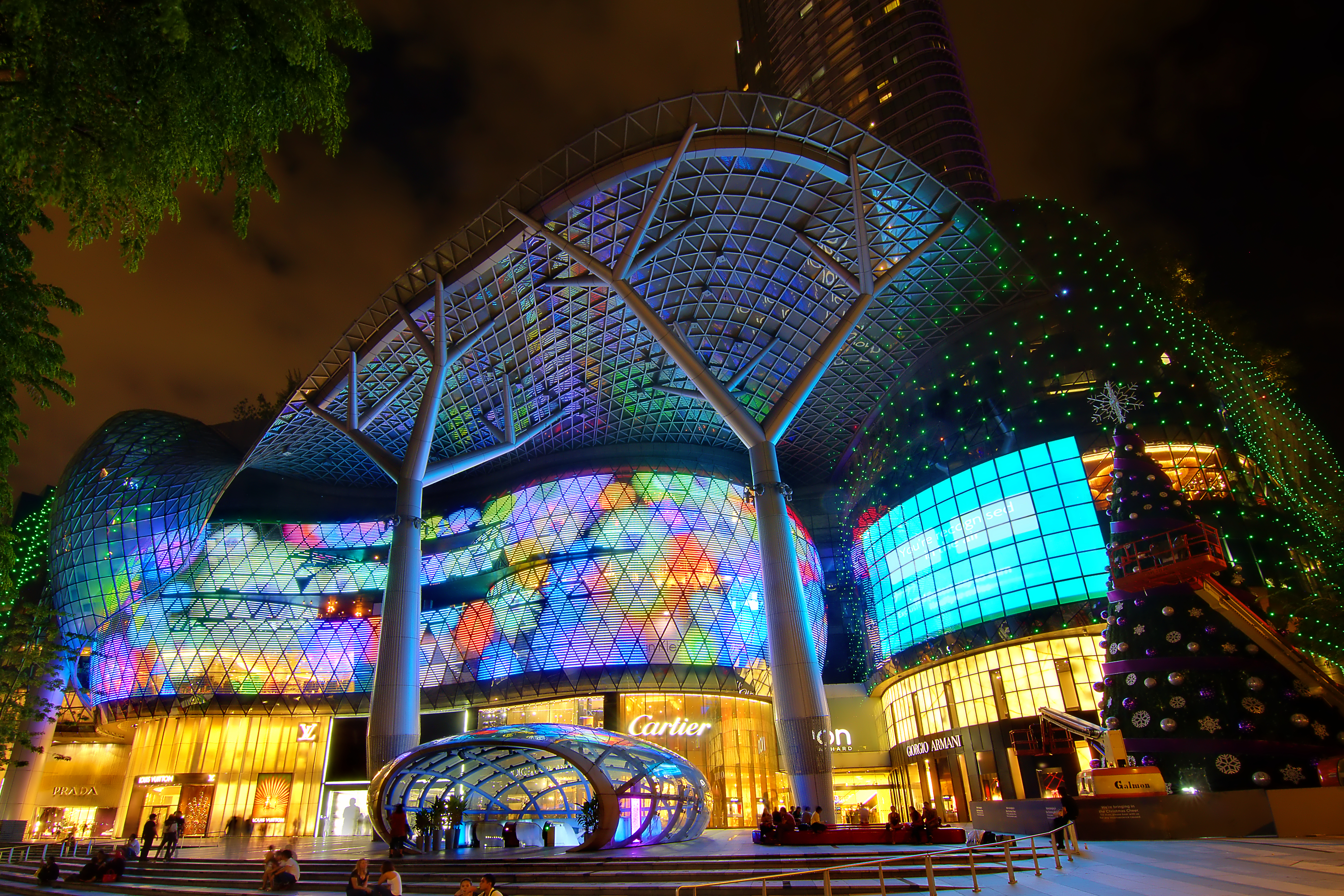
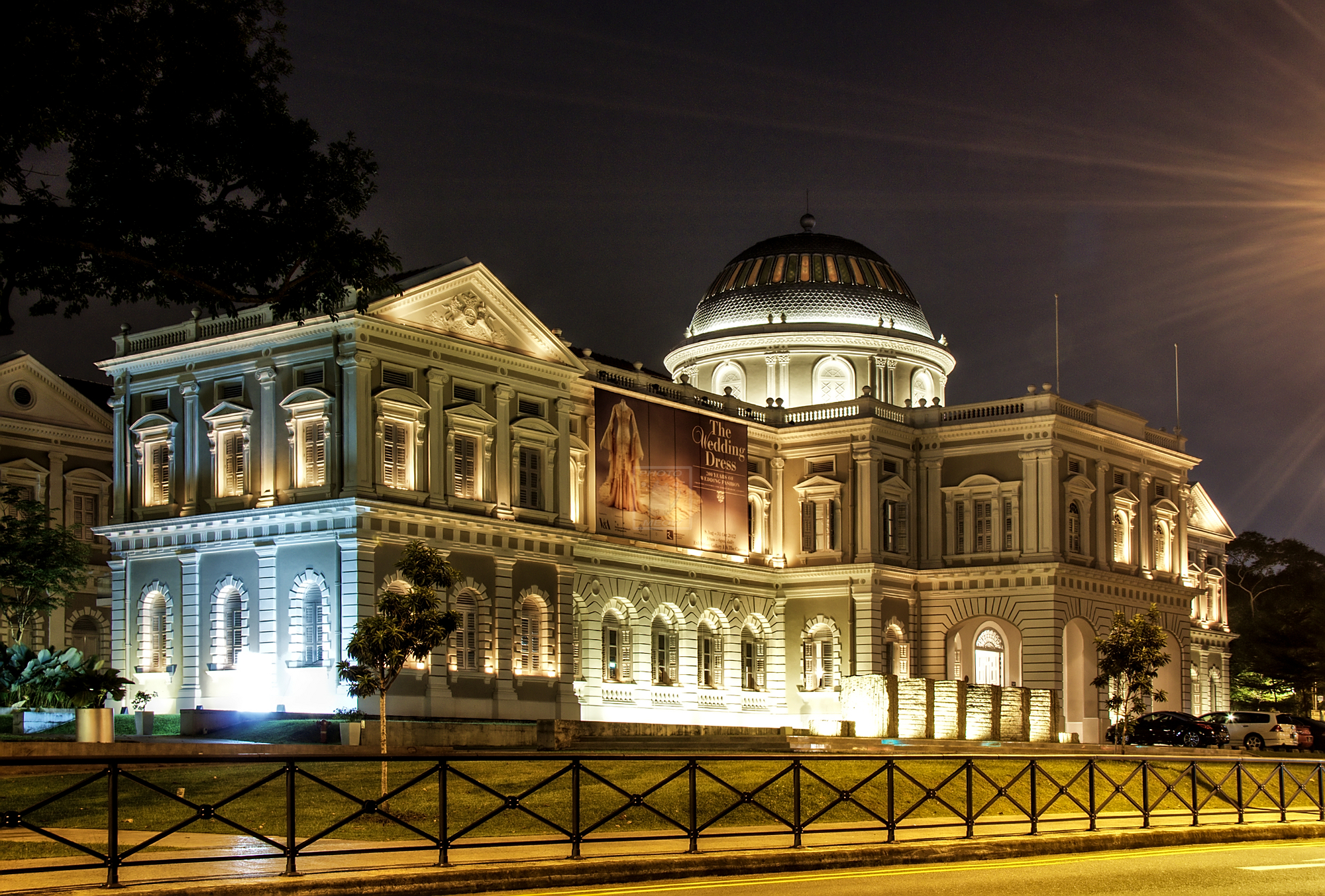
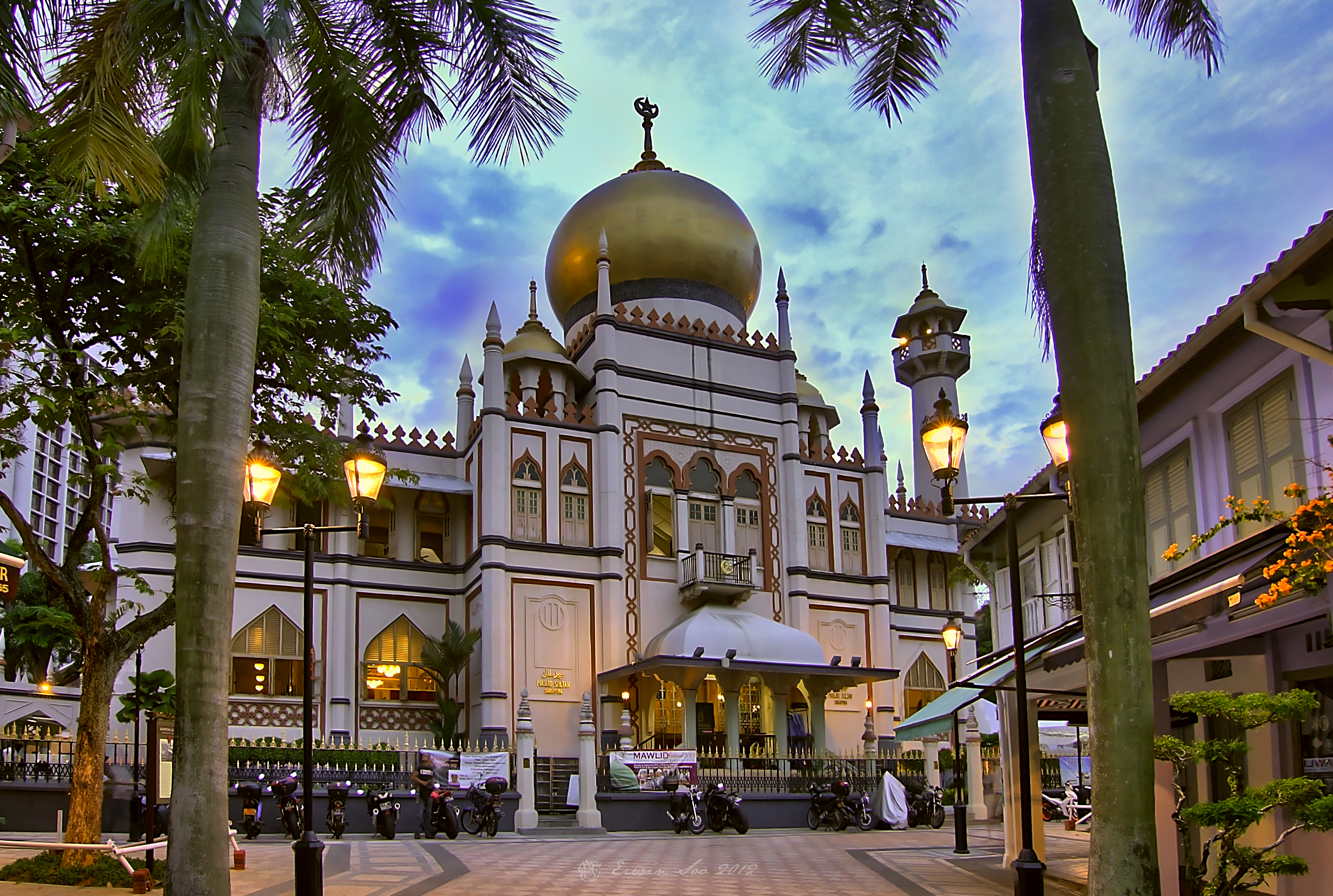
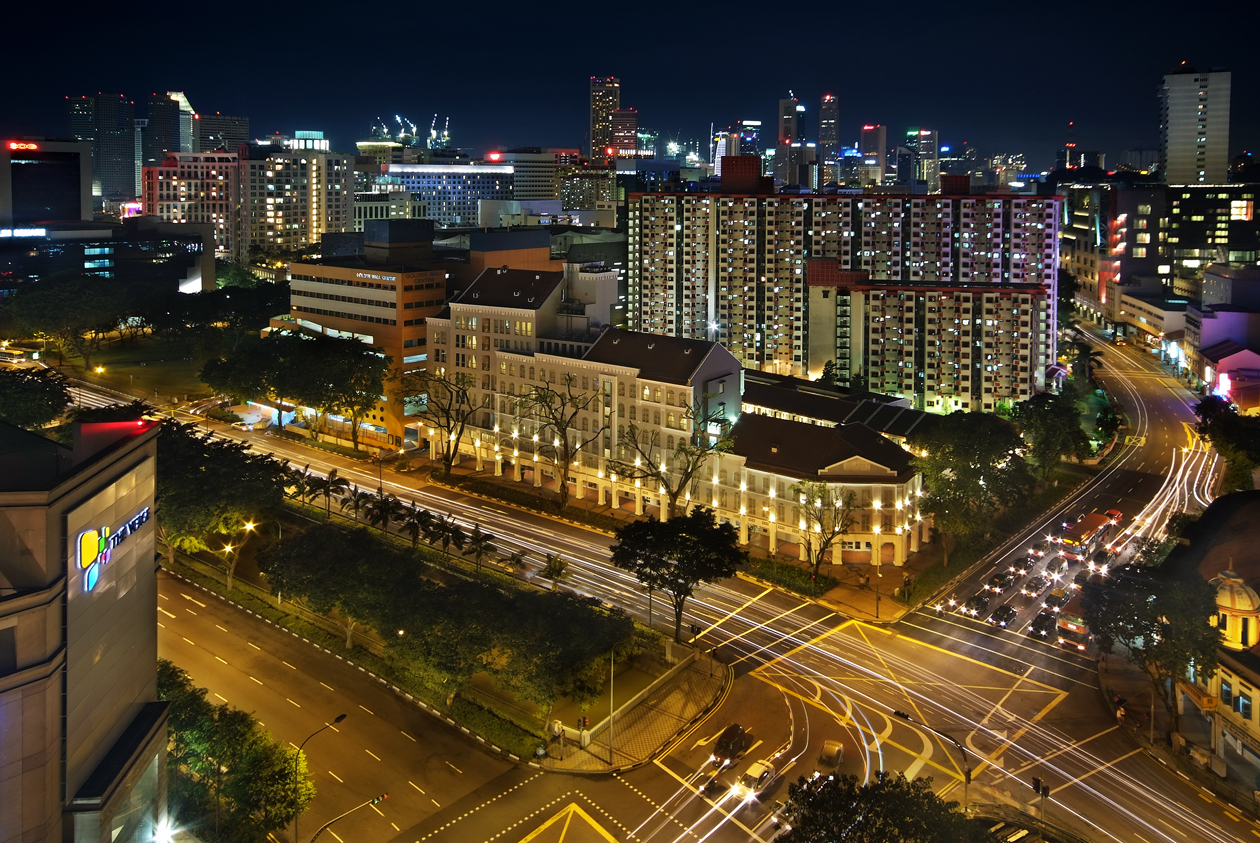
- Skyline of Singapore's Downtown Core The Helix Bridge with Marina Bay Sands in the background Gardens by the Bay Clarke Quay Raffles Place ION Orchard The National Museum of Singapore Masjid Sultan in Kampong Glam Rochor

- Location of the Central Area in Central Region
- Interactive map of Central Area
- Central Area within Singapore Central Area (Asia) Central Area (Earth)
- Coordinates: 1°17′30″N 103°51′00″E
- Country: Singapore
- Region: Central Region
- Planning Areas: 11: Downtown Core; Marina East; Marina South; Museum; Newton; Orchard; Outram; River Valley; Rochor; Singapore River; Straits View
- CDCs: Central Singapore CDC; South East CDC
- Town Councils: Jalan Besar Town Council; Marine Parade–Braddell Heights Town Council; Tanjong Pagar Town Council
- Constituencies: Jalan Besar GRC; Mountbatten SMC; Tanjong Pagar GRC
- Central Area created: 22 January 1999

Government
  - Mayors: Central Singapore CDC: Denise Phua; South East CDC: Dinesh Vasu Dash
  - Members of Parliament: Jalan Besar GRC: Denise Phua; Josephine Teo; Mountbatten SMC: Gho Sze Kee; Tanjong Pagar GRC: Foo Cexiang; Joan Pereira; Alvin Tan

Area
  - City: 17.84 km^{2} (6.89 sq mi)
  - Metro: 132.7 km^{2} (51.2 sq mi)

Population (2015)
  - City: 60,520
  - Density: 3,392/km^{2} (8,786/sq mi)
  - Metro: 939,890
  - Metro density: 7,083/km^{2} (18,340/sq mi)
- Postal districts: 1, 6, 7, 8, 9
- Dwelling units: 12,571

The Central Area is the main commercial and financial city centre of Singapore. Located in the south-eastern part of the Central Region, it broadly corresponds to the historic City of Singapore, while the term Singapore has since come to refer to the entire sovereign city-state. The Central Area consists of eleven constituent planning areas: the Downtown Core, Marina East, Marina South, Museum, Newton, Orchard, Outram, River Valley, Rochor, the Singapore River and Straits View, as defined by the Urban Redevelopment Authority (URA). The term Central Business District (CBD) has also been used to describe most of the Central Area as well, although its boundaries technically lie within the Downtown Core.

Singapore's modern history began in this area, when British colonial official Stamford Raffles and representatives of the British East India Company landed along the banks of the Singapore River in 1819 to set up a free port of trade between Europe and Asia. As the old harbour grew along the mouth of the river bank, the historical city naturally expanded around it, creating what is now the Central Area. As the financial heart of Singapore, the Downtown Core also houses the headquarters and offices of numerous major corporations, both local and international, as well as the Singapore Exchange (SGX). As the country's de facto capital, it is also home to many governmental institutions, most notably the seat of Parliament and the Supreme Court.

The Central Area surrounds the banks of the Singapore River and Marina Bay where the first settlements on the island were established shortly after the arrival of Raffles in 1819. Surrounding the Central Area is the rest of the Central Region. The Central Area shares boundaries with the planning areas of Novena to the north, Kallang to the north and north-east, Tanglin to the north-west and west, Bukit Merah to the south-west and Marine Parade to the east. The south-easternmost limits of the city is enclosed by Marina Barrage, where the mouth of Marina Bay meets the Singapore Strait.

== History ==
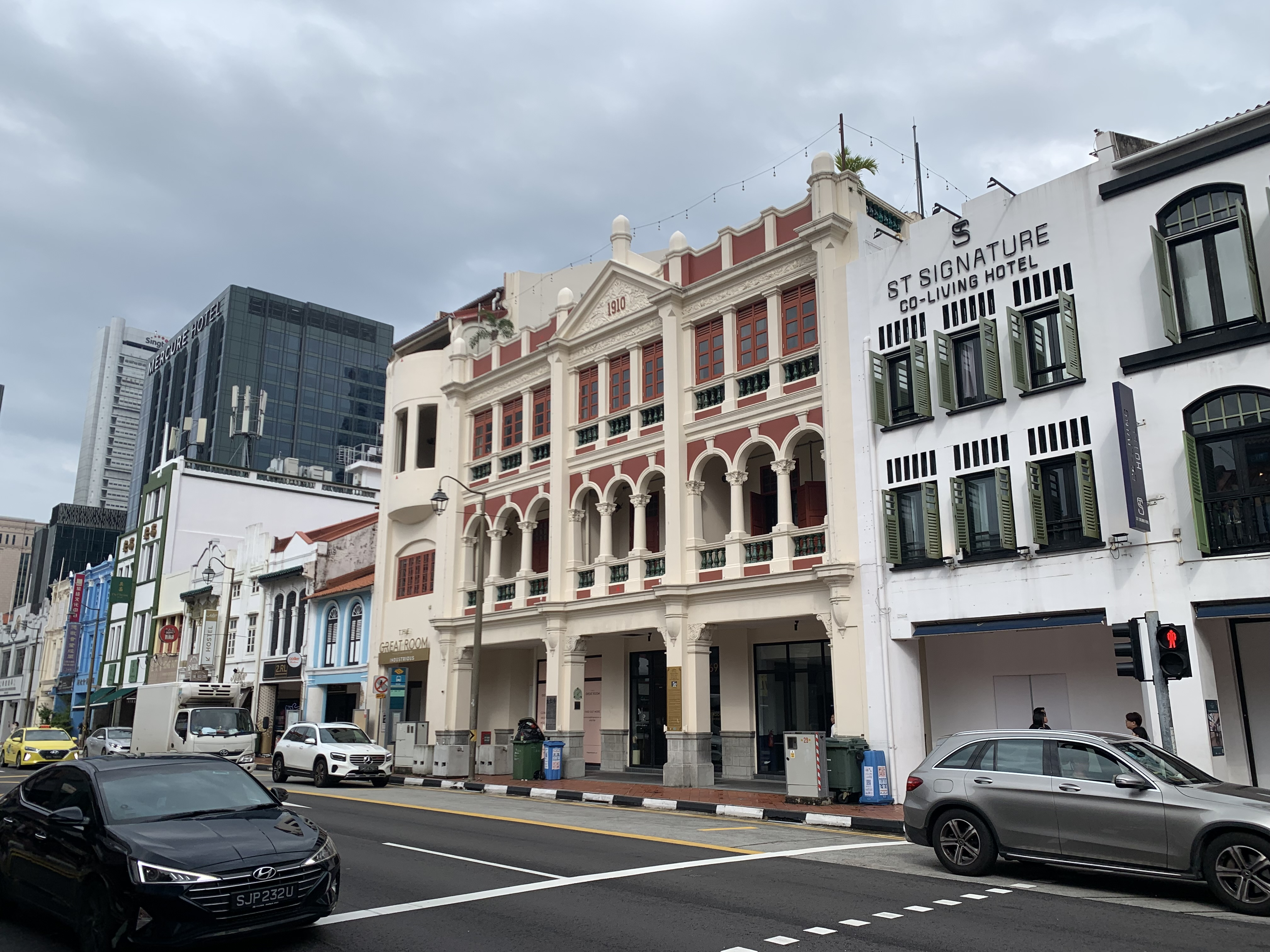
Shophouses along South Bridge Road, which included the first Eu Yan Sang outlet when it was constructed in 1910.

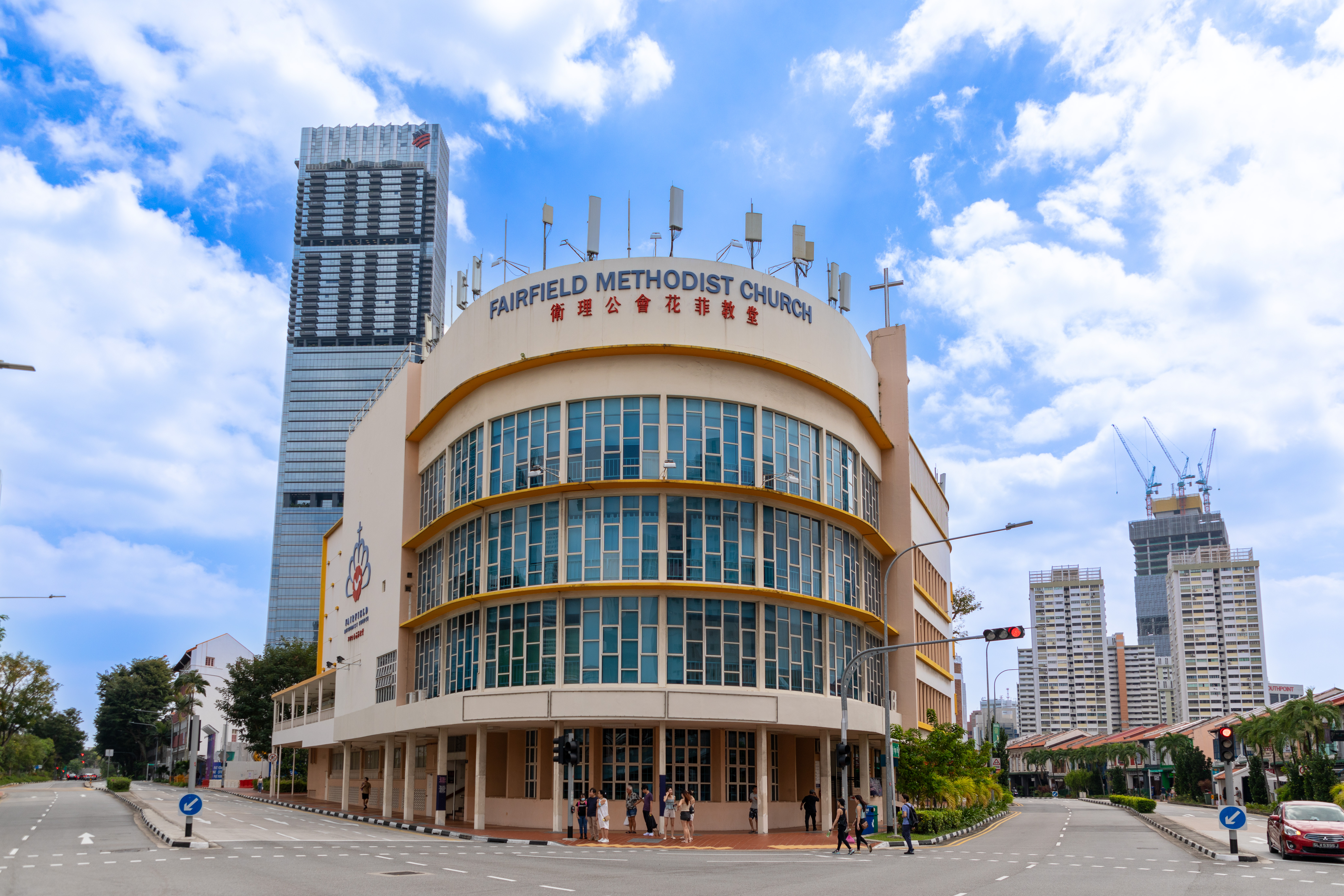
Fairfield Methodist Church, constructed in 1958 as a cinema, with Guoco Tower in the background.

=== Early years ===
The Central Area is among the most densely developed parts of Singapore. It represents the historical core of the city, tracing its origins to the Jackson Plan of the 1820s following the 1819 Singapore Treaty that marked the beginning of modern-day Singapore. As part of the Straits Settlements, districts within the Central Area functioned as centres of trade and commerce, particularly the Singapore River area. Other districts such as Rochor, Newton, River Valley and Outram also maintain strong commercial activity but generally feature fewer skyscrapers and a larger proportion of residential development. These areas include schools, condominiums and public Housing Development Board (HDB) flats, typically commanding higher prices and longer minimum occupation periods due to their status as being located in "prime areas". Much of the land around Telok Ayer Street, which today contains a high concentration of commercial skyscrapers, was created through land reclamation carried out over the last century. These include nearby landmarks such as Lau Pa Sat, which was founded as a waterfront market that used to face the Singapore Strait.

In 1951, the Municipal Commission governing Singapore's modern Central Area was granted city status by royal charter from King George VI. At the time, Singapore was still a British crown colony. Parts of the Central Area also reflected historical social and community functions. For example, the shophouses on Ann Siang Hill were historically used as clan houses by various Chinese associations in the Chinatown area. Following World War II, acute housing shortages led to the expansion of public housing developments by the Singapore Improvement Trust (SIT) and later the HDB after 1960 in surrounding areas. The Central Area was also been the site of significant historical events, including the MacDonald House bombing orchestrated by Indonesia during the Konfrontasi in 1965. The attack on the building at Orchard Road resulted in three deaths and injured at least 33 people.

=== Since independence ===
From the 1970s, the Government of Singapore and the Urban Redevelopment Authority (URA) undertook extensive land reclamation projects at Marina Bay to accommodate the continued growth of the Central Area. These reclaimed areas were planned as Marina East, Marina South and Straits View, with major commercial and residential developments progressively completed from the 1990s. Today, the Central Area houses the headquarters of numerous multinational companies (MNCs). Singapore's tallest buildings are concentrated around Raffles Place and Shenton Way and are generally subject to a height limit of 280 m (920 ft) pending the decommissioning of Paya Lebar Airbase in the 2030s. Exceptions include Guoco Tower, which reaches 290 m (950 ft), and Skywaters Residences, which is expected to become the country's first supertall skyscraper at 305 m (1,001 ft) upon its completion in 2028.

== Amenities ==
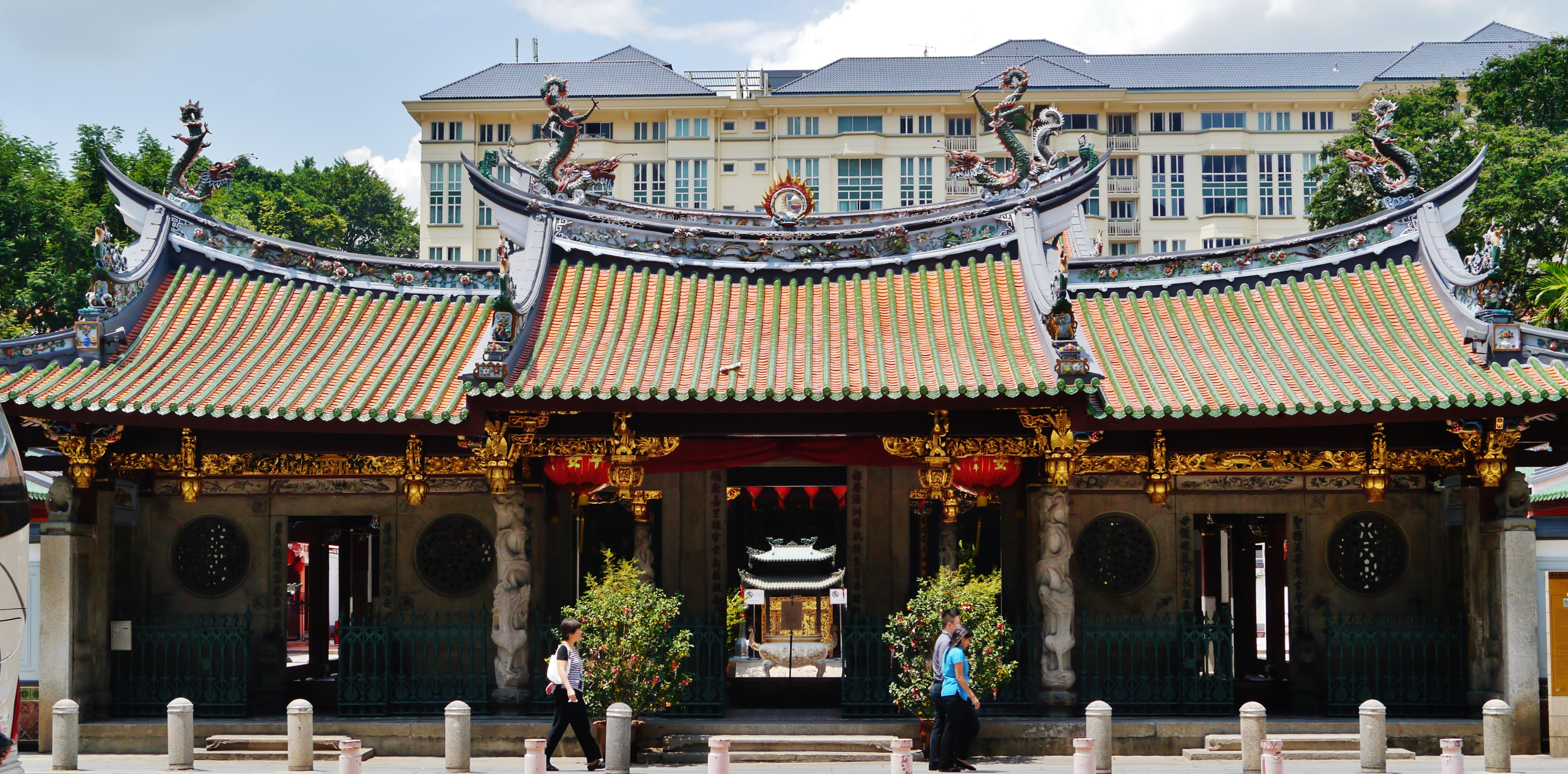
Thian Hock Keng Temple, established between 1821 and 1822, is the oldest Hokkien temple in Singapore.

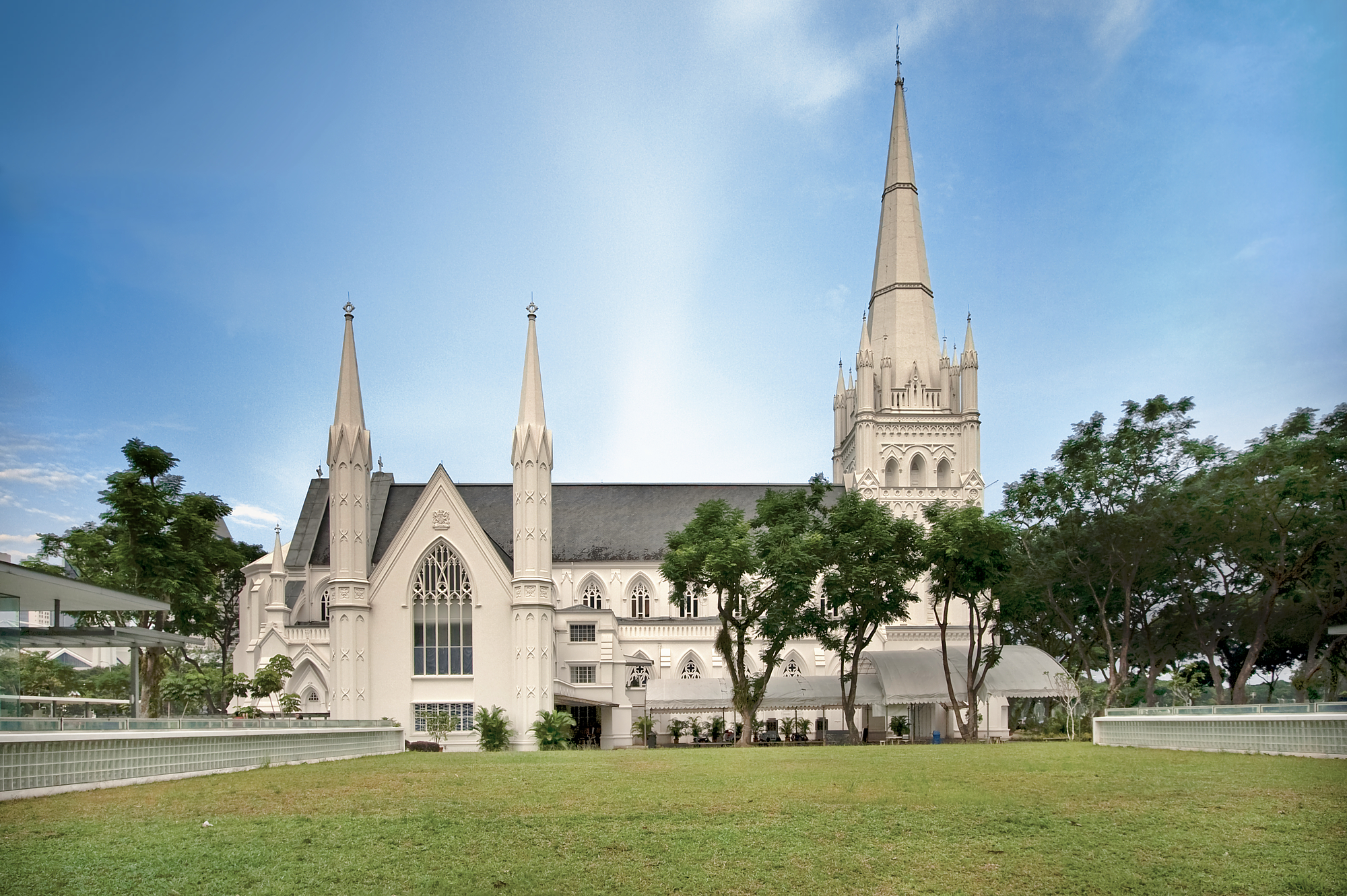
St Andrew's Cathedral, built between 1856 and 1862, serves as the seat of the Anglican Diocese of Singapore.

The Raffles Garden within Fort Canning Park, an 18-hectare historic hill site in the Central Area.

The National Gallery Singapore, housed within the historic former City Hall and Supreme Court buildings in the Civic District.

=== Places of worship ===
The Central Area contains a high concentration of historic religious institutions, reflecting the multi-cultural heritage of early Singapore. Among its Chinese places of worship, Thian Hock Keng Temple, dedicated to the sea goddess Mazu, was first established between 1821 and 1822 before being designated as a national monument in 1973. Another major site, Yueh Hai Ching Temple, stands as one of the oldest Taoist temples in the country, constructed in 1826 and gazetted as a national monument in 1996. Located on Waterloo Street, Kwan Im Thong Hood Cho Temple was established in 1884 and remains one of the most heavily frequented temples for Chinese Buddhism in Singapore.

Christian heritage in the district encompasses both Protestantism and Catholicism. The Armenian Church, completed in 1835, is the oldest surviving Christian church in Singapore. Anglican heritage is anchored by St Andrew's Cathedral, constructed between 1856 and 1862 to replace an earlier structure, serving as the principal seat of the Anglican Diocese of Singapore. The Cathedral of the Good Shepherd, completed in 1847, serves as the seat of the Roman Catholic Archdiocese of Singapore. All three were gazetted as national monuments in 1973.

The area also features important sites for Hindu, Islamic, and Jewish communities. Sri Mariamman Temple, founded in 1827, stands as Singapore's oldest Hindu temple and was named a national monument in 1973. Nearby, Sultan Mosque, initially built in 1826 and reconstructed into its larger present structure in 1932, was gazetted in 1975; it acts as the country's de facto national mosque and holds central importance to the local Muslim community. Another historic Islamic site, Jamae Mosque, was established on South Bridge Road between 1826 and 1830 by Chulia Tamil immigrants and designated a national monument in 1973. Serving the Jewish community, Maghain Aboth Synagogue was constructed in 1878 as the main place of worship and unofficial focal point for local Jewish activity, receiving national monument status in 1998.

=== Education and civic facilities ===
The Central Area contains several tertiary educational institutions, notably within the Bras Basah subzone. These include Singapore Management University (SMU), which operates a city campus integrated into the area, alongside arts institutions such as the Nanyang Academy of Fine Arts, LASALLE College of the Arts and the School of the Arts.

The Central Area also features several repurposed historical sites and monuments. CHIJMES, located on Victoria Street, was established in 1854 as a Catholic convent; its surviving structures, including Caldwell House and the chapel, were gazetted as national monuments in 1990 before being converted into a modern dining complex. Nearby along the Singapore River close to Coleman Bridge, a replica stands on the site of Whampoa's Ice House, a former nineteenth century industrial landmark. Additionally, 38 Oxley Road, the residence of Singapore's first prime minister Lee Kuan Yew from the 1940s until his death in 2015 and the site of early political meetings, was gazetted as a national monument in 2025.

=== Parks and public spaces ===
Public parks in the Central Area include Fort Canning Park, an 18 hectares (44 acres) hill site containing pre-colonial artifacts and colonial military structures. Open spaces along the Civic District include the Padang and adjacent Esplanade Park, which serve as venues for public events and National Day Parades. Other public open areas include Hong Lim Park, the location of Singapore's Speakers' Corner, as well as waterfront promenades along the Singapore River and Marina Bay.

== Politics ==
The Central Area is under the jurisdiction of three constituencies, namely Jalan Besar Group Representation Constituency (GRC), Tanjong Pagar GRC and Mountbatten Single Member Constituency (SMC), all of which are represented in Parliament by the governing People's Action Party (PAP) per the results of the 2025 general election.

== Transportation ==
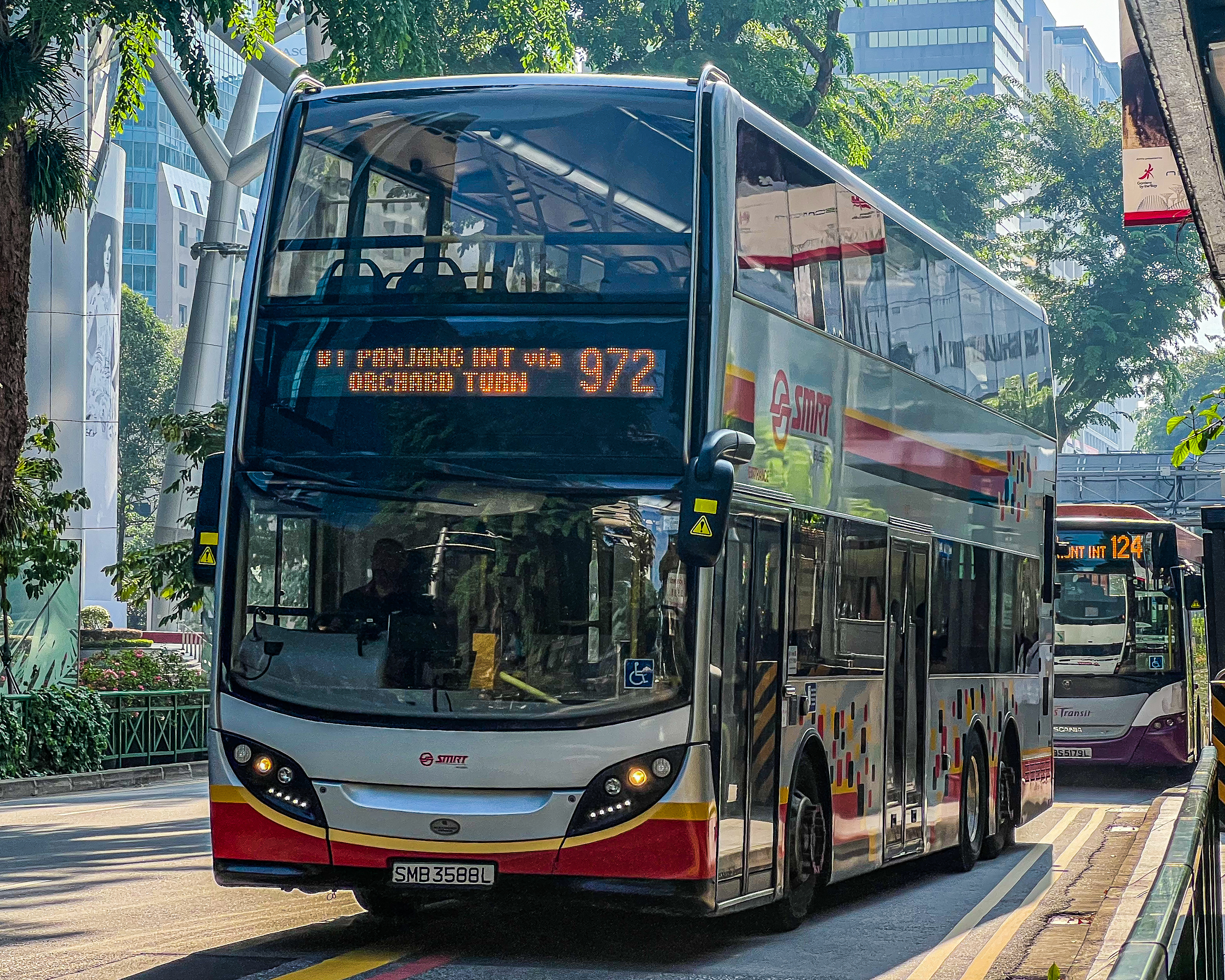
Public buses at Orchard Road, a tourist district in the Central Area

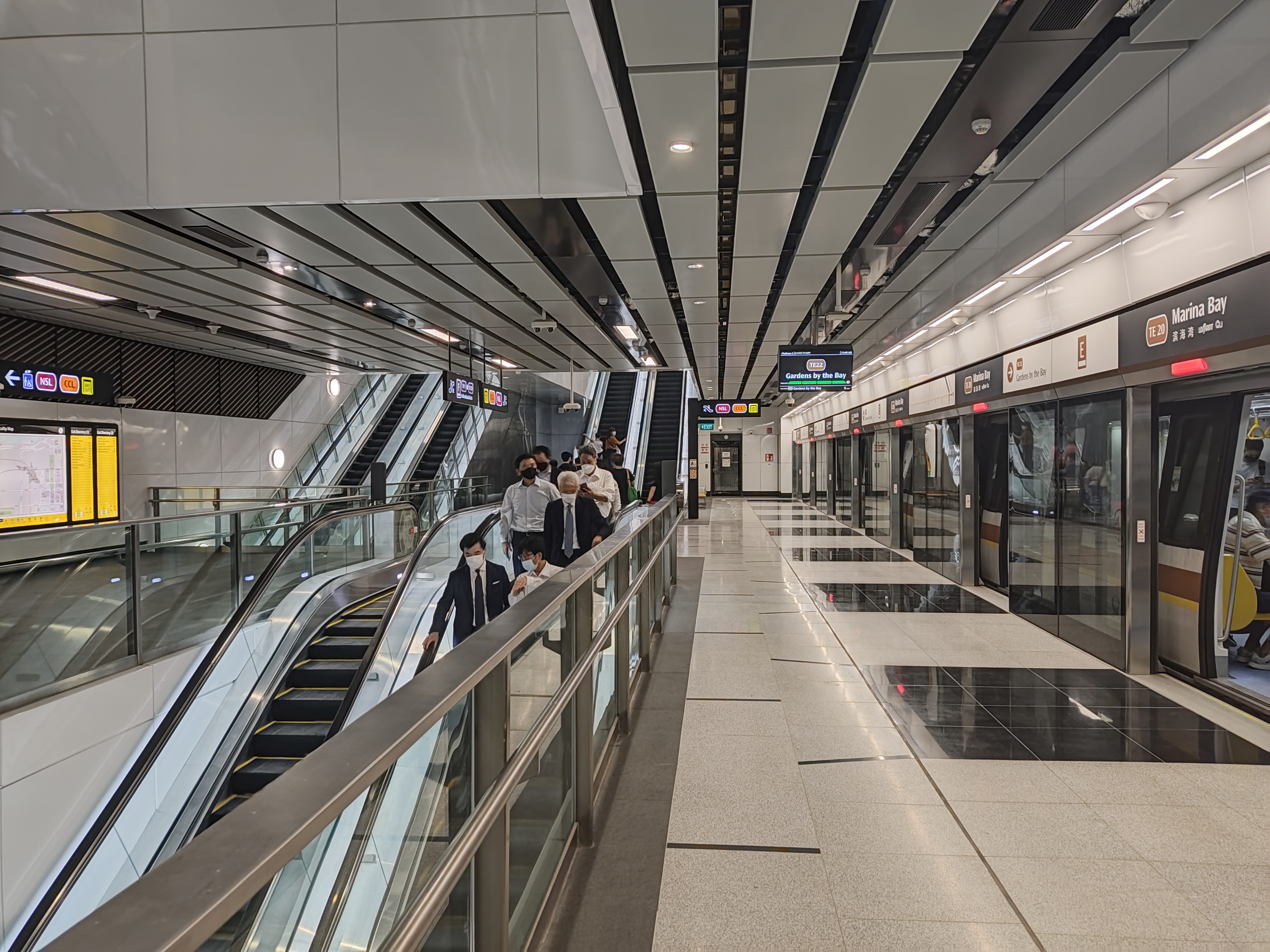
Thomson–East Coast Line platforms at the triple-interchange Marina Bay station

For more than a century, there has been a high volume of traffic entering the modern-day Central Area because of its role as the financial core of Singapore, which has resulted in a dense concentration of commercial developments. To manage congestion in the Central Area, the government has introduced a range of measures. These include the installation of Electronic Road Pricing (ERP) gantries, whose operating hours and charges are regularly adjusted to reflect prevailing traffic conditions. The North–South Corridor (NSE) is also expected to ease traffic flows from the northern parts of Singapore into the Central Area upon its completion in 2029.

Public transport plays a central role in supporting access to the Central Area. There are extensive public bus services linking the Central Area with other parts of Singapore, including express and city-direct services. The country's rapid rail transit system, the Mass Rapid Transit (MRT), is particularly dense in the Central Area, which contains more than two dozen stations. Six MRT lines pass through the Central Area, with multiple interchange stations linking the East–West Line, the North–South Line, the North East Line, the Circle Line, the Downtown Line and the Thomson–East Coast Line.

== See also ==
- Architecture of Singapore
- Tourism in Singapore
- City of Singapore (historical entity)
- Central Singapore District
