= Coleman Bridge, Singapore =

Bridge in central Singapore

Coleman Bridge 哥里门桥 Jambatan Coleman
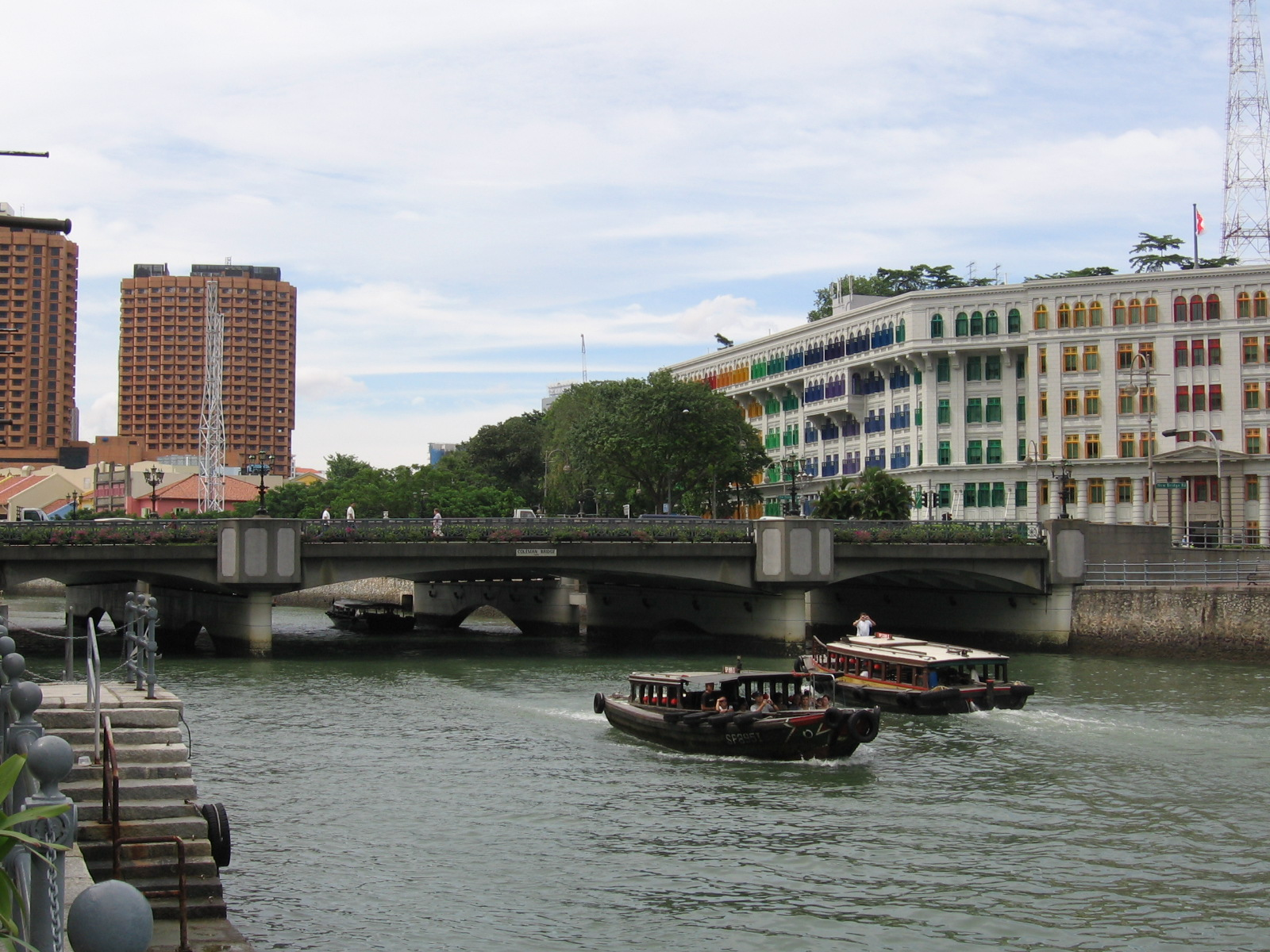
- Coordinates: 1°17′23″N 103°50′53″E
- Carries: Vehicles and pedestrians
- Crosses: Singapore River
- Locale: Downtown Core and the Singapore River Planning Area, Singapore

Location
- Interactive map of Coleman Bridge

Coleman Bridge is a vehicular bridge in Singapore. The bridge links Hill Street and New Bridge Road, spanning the Singapore River near Clarke Quay. Part of the bridge demarcates the boundary between the Downtown Core and the Singapore River Planning Area, both of which are located within the Central Area.

The Coleman Bridge was the second bridge built across the Singapore River and the first built in masonry.

== History ==
In 1840, a brick bridge joining Old Bridge Road and Hill Street over the Singapore River was constructed and called Coleman Bridge. The bridge had nine arches, and was designed by and named after George Drumgoole Coleman (1795–1844), an Irish architect and Singapore's first architect. It was referred to as the New Bridge, lending its name to the road on its southern end — New Bridge Road.

In 1865, the brick bridge was replaced by one made of timber but was not well constructed. It cost about Straits $10,000 and was built by the government.

In 1886, an iron bridge was built to replace the wooden one. This iron bridge was considered one of the most attractive spanning the Singapore River. It was present for about 100 years, where the bridge had shown signs of ageing, and the need to refurbish the bridge. The widening of Coleman Bridge was planned since 1977, but had not been announced until 1984, where the construction of the extra road necessitated the demolition of the old iron bridge. The eastbound carriageway was shifted to the western side, where the traffic switch is in March 1986. It was replaced by present concrete bridge in December 1987 for the westbound carriageway. The move facilitates better traffic flow for about 15 years before the North East MRT line opens.

However, several features of the iron bridge such as the decorative lamp posts and iron railings were incorporated into the current structure, in recognition of its historical significance.

Coleman Bridge is known as yi ma lo khiu or "the bridge at the second road" in Cantonese.

== See also ==
- List of bridges in Singapore
- Whampoa's Ice House
