= Bendemeer, Singapore =

Bendemeer
- Subzone of Kallang Planning Area

Other transcription(s)
  - Chinese: 明地迷亚
  - Malay: Bendemeer
  - Tamil: பென்ட்டிமியிர்
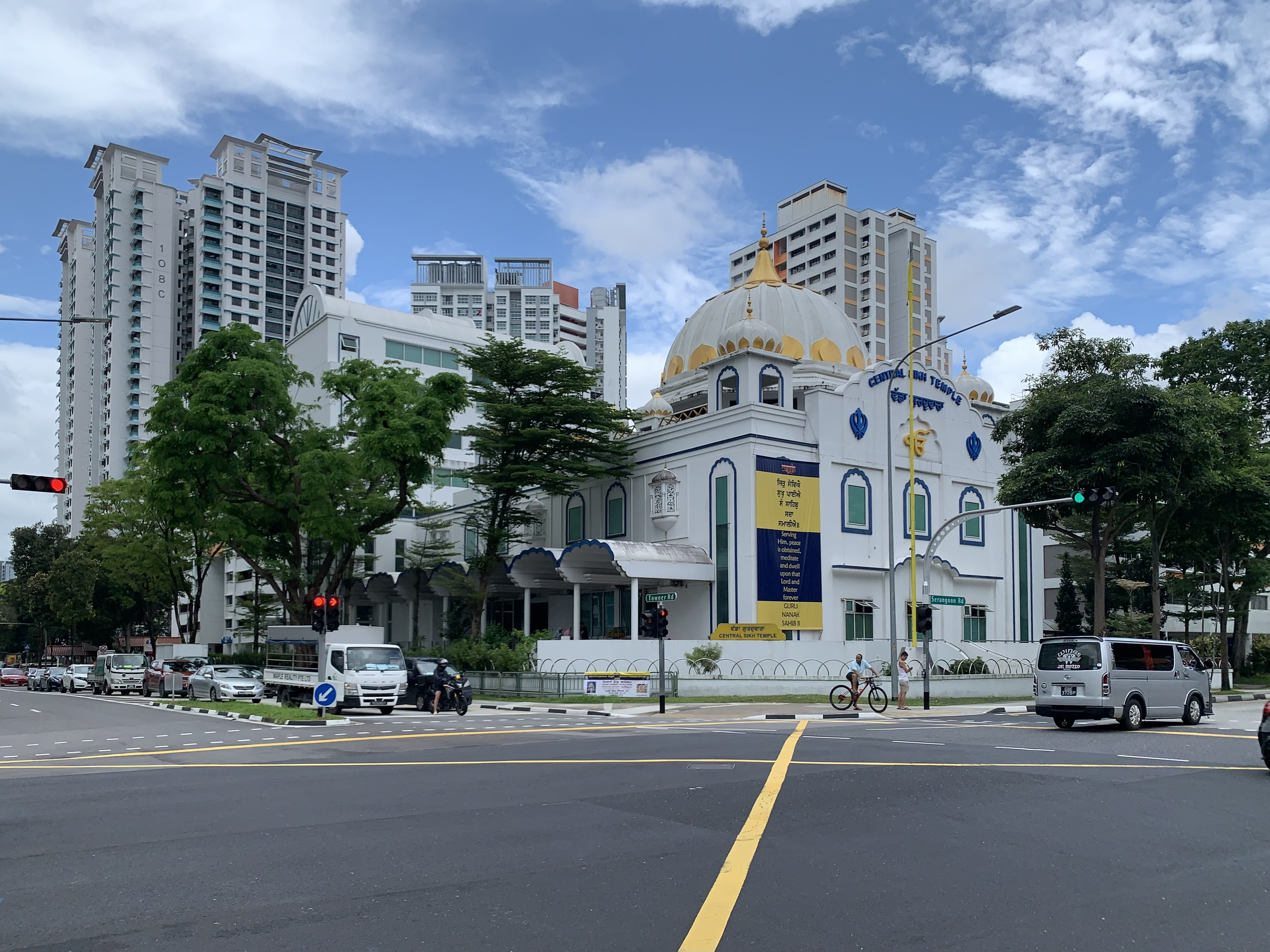
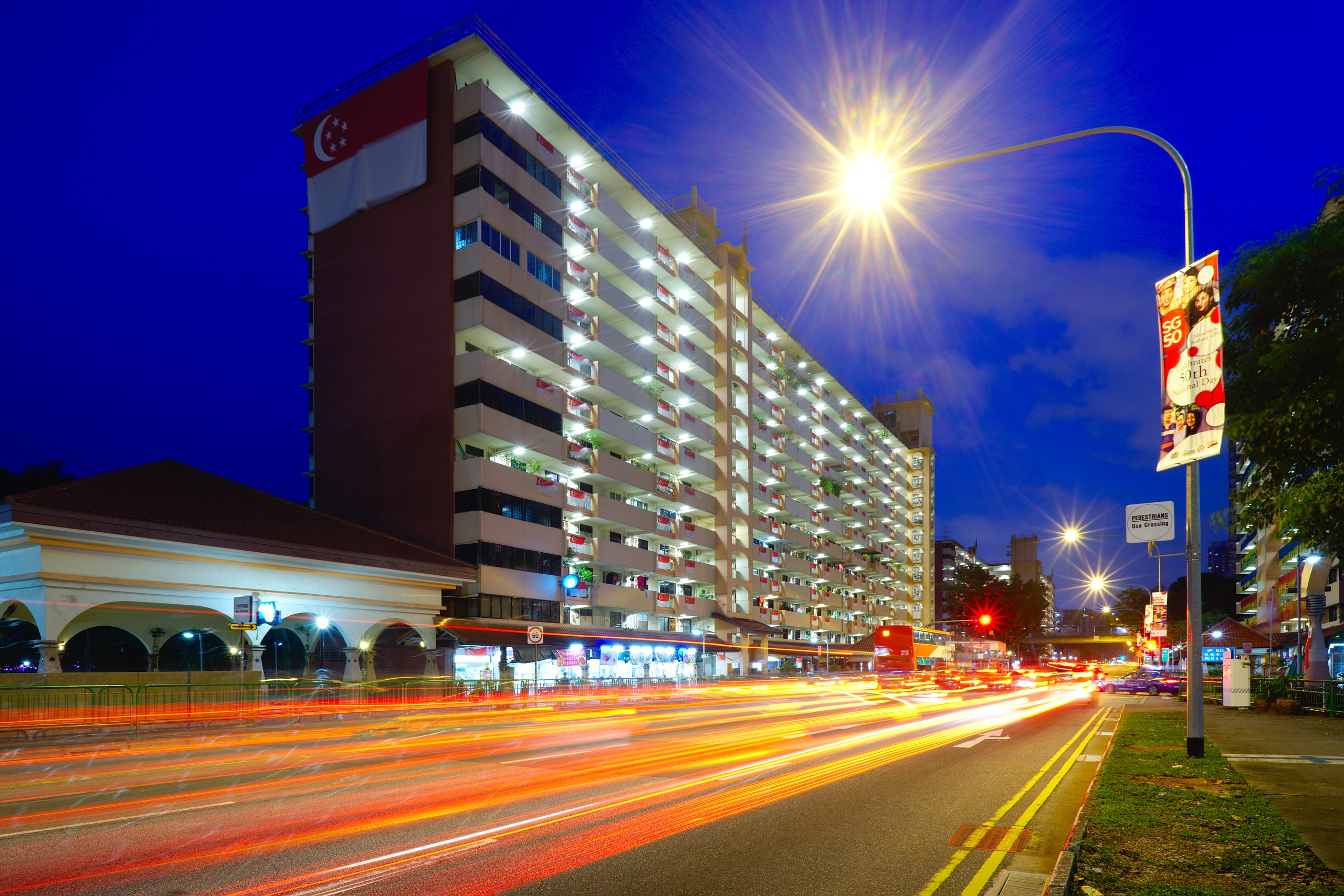
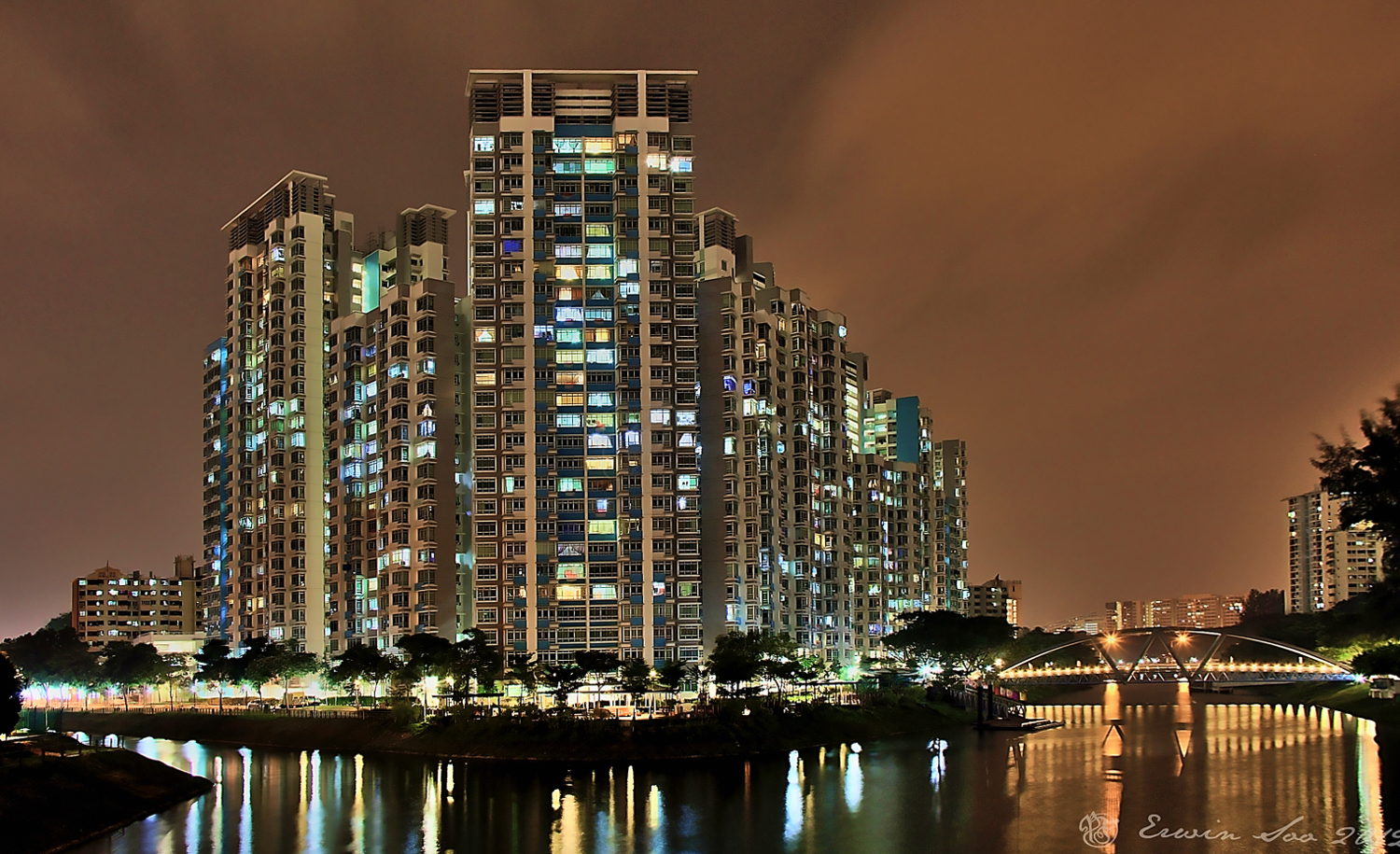
- Row 1: Central Sikh Temple; Row 2, left: Block 44 Bendemeer Road; Row 2, right: River Vista @ Kallang at the confluence of the Kallang River and Sungei Whampoa

- Location of Bendeemer in Singapore
- Coordinates: 1°19′13.69″N 103°51′54.26″E
- Country: Singapore
- Region: Central Region
- Planning Area: Kallang

Area
  - Total: 1.38 km^{2} (0.53 sq mi)

Population (2026)
  - Total: 38,660
  - Density: 28,000/km^{2} (72,600/sq mi)

Bendemeer (/ˈbɛndəˌmɪər/; Chinese: 明地迷亚, Tamil: பென்ட்டிமியிர்) is a subzone within the planning area of Kallang, Singapore, as defined by the Urban Redevelopment Authority (URA). Its boundary is made up of the Pan Island Expressway (PIE) in the north; Serangoon Road, the Kallang River, Sungei Whampoa, and Bendemeer Road in the east; Lavender Street and Balestier Road in the south; and the Central Expressway (CTE) in the west.

Bendemeer is primarily residential, compromising both public housing built by the Housing and Development Board (HDB) and private housing. Educational institutions within this subzone include Hong Wen School, Bendemeer Primary School, Bendemeer Secondary School, and Northlight School.

Based on historical map evidence provided by NUS, the road in its present form was constructed sometime between 1966 and 1969, similar to the construction of Orchard Boulevard to alleviate the traffic congestion along Serangoon Road.

== Amenities ==
=== Medical facilities ===
- Kallang Polyclinic
- Kwong Wai Shiu Hospital

=== Places of worship ===
- Sri Lankaramaya Buddhist Temple
- Central Sikh Temple

==== Community club ====
- Kallang Community Club

=== Civil services ===
- Kallang Neighbourhood Police Post
- Boon Keng Fire Post,

== Notable places ==
- 34 Whampoa West

== Transportation ==
The Bendemeer MRT station along the Downtown line serves the area.
