= Bendemeer House =

Former residence of Chinese merchant Hoo Ah Kay

- Entrance arch to Whampoa Gardens, located on the grounds of Bendemeer House.

General information
- Demolished: 1964

The Bendemeer House, originally known as the House of Whampoa or the Whampoa House, was the former residence of Chinese merchant Hoo Ah Kay in Singapore. The house was demolished in 1964 to make way for redevelopment of the area.

== History ==
The estate included 160 hectares of land along Serangoon Road, and included a large garden, known as the Whampoa Garden. Whampoa frequently invited guests into his home, including Admiral Henry Keppel. The garden included an orange plantation, fruit orchards, rockeries, artificial ponds, aquariums, and plants trimmed to look like animals. The gardens were maintained by horticulturists and also included a small zoo and an aviary. The gardens served as a public gathering place for the Chinese community in the Colony of Singapore.

Following Whampoa's death in 1880, the estate was bought over by Seah Liang Seah, who renamed it the Bendemeer House. In 1964, the government purchased the estate for $3.8 million and demolished it to make way for urban developments.
