= Hoo Ah Kay =

Singaporean businessman and community leader

Hoo Ah Kay CMG
- 胡亞基
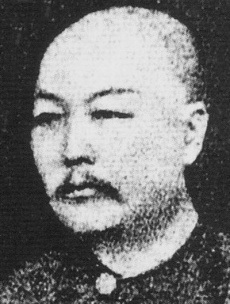
- Born: 1816; Whampoa, Canton, Qing Empire (now Huangpu District, Guangzhou, China)
- Died: 27 March 1880 (aged 63–64)
- Other name: Whampoa
- Occupation: Businessman
- Office: Member of the Legislative Council of Singapore; Extraordinary Member of the Executive Council of Singapore; Honourable Consul of Singapore to China, Japan and Russia

Hoo Ah Kay
- Traditional Chinese: 胡亞基
- Simplified Chinese: 胡亚基
- Jyutping: Wu^{4} Aa^{3}-gei^{1}
Transcriptions
Standard Mandarin
- Hanyu Pinyin: Hú Yàjī
Yue: Cantonese
- Jyutping: Wu^{4} Aa^{3}-gei^{1}

Hoo Ah Kay CMG (Chinese: 胡亞基; pinyin: Hú Yàjī; 1816 – 27 March 1880), better known as Whampoa (Chinese: 黄埔; pinyin: Huángpǔ; Jyutping: Wong^{4} bou^{3}), was a Singaporean businessman and community leader. An immigrant from China to Singapore, he held many high-ranking posts in Singapore, including honourable consul to China, Japan and Russia.

== Early life ==
Hoo Ah Kay (Hu Hsuan-tse) was born 1816, in Whampoa, Canton, Qing Empire (present-day Huangpu District, Guangzhou, China). He immigrated to Singapore in 1830. Initially working with his businessman father at food supplier Whampoa and Co., Hoo inherited the establishment after his father died.

== Career ==
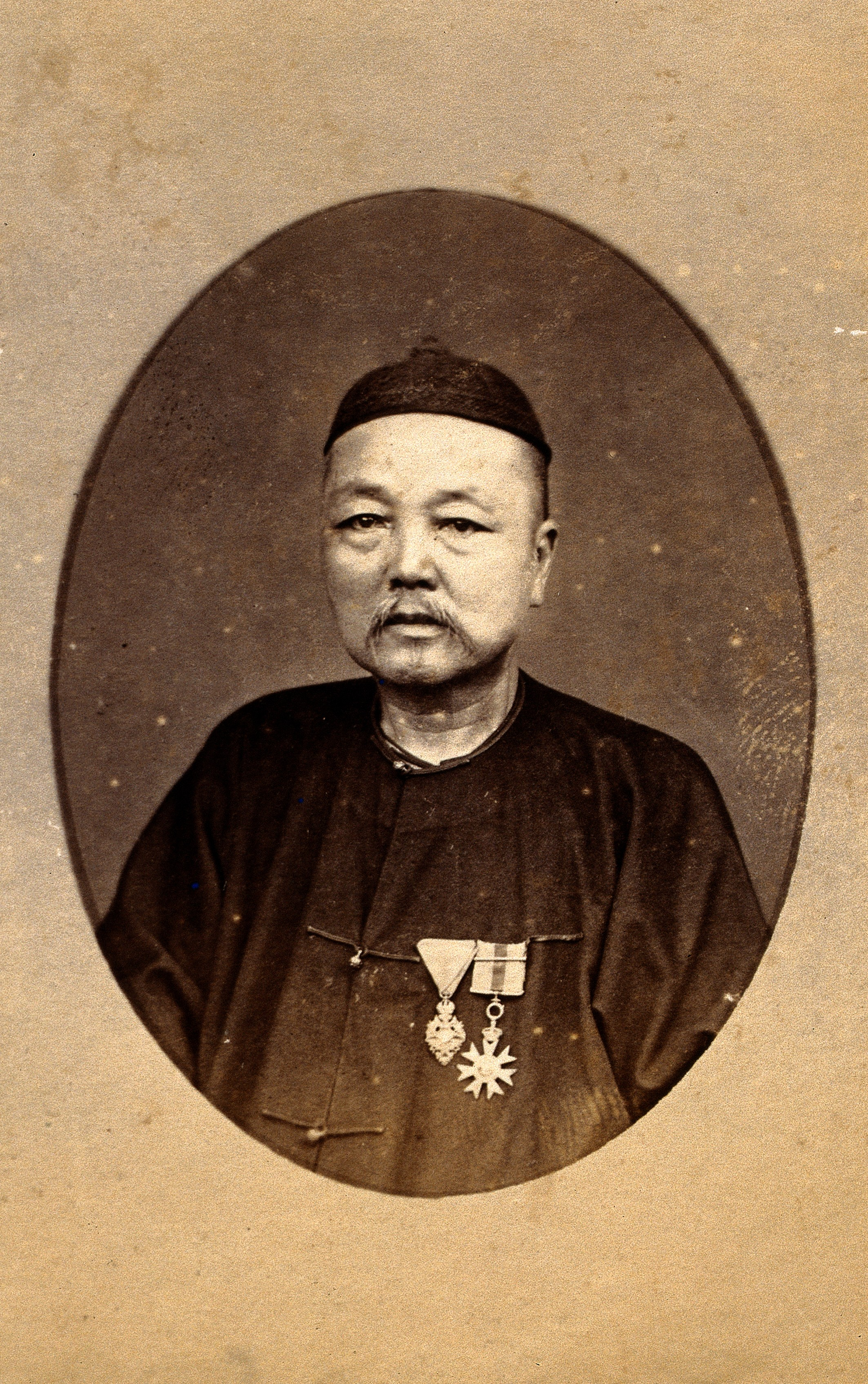
The Hon. Hoh-Ah-Kay (Whampoa), C.M.G., M.L.C., and Consul for Russia, China and Japan.

Hoo received the honorific Mr. Whampoa for his political achievements and contributions to the Singaporean society. He is cited as both "the first Japanese honorable consul in Singapore" and "the first Chinese consul [in Singapore]", two posts he was given in 1877 and 1879 respectively.

In 1859, Hoo played a key role in establishing the Singapore Botanic Gardens (now a UNESCO World Heritage Site). In 1869, he was announced as the first Legislative Council member of Chinese ethnicity by the British, albeit an unofficial one. He was also a retail dealer specialising in ships working for the British Royal Navy. For a period of time, he ran a business supplying ice imported from the United States to Singapore; it folded in 1856. Hoo was hailed as "one of the most influential Chinese (Cantonese) tycoons in Singapore". He was awarded the Order of St Michael and St George, Class Companion (CMG). In 1869, he became the first Asian member of the Legislative Council and within a few years, he was made an extraordinary member of the Executive Council, the only Chinese to have held this position.

== Personal life ==
Hoo was described as having led a rich and glamorous lifestyle, occasionally organizing elaborate meals, mostly intended for overseas visitors. He would hire many dancers to perform for him, as well as personal servants to fan him, as depicted in an illustration by English painter Edward Cree. He also owned a few race horses; one of them reportedly earned him about a hundred thousand dollars. Hoo frequently let the public at large visit his residence, which was depicted as sprawling with lush greenery. Despite being eloquent in the English language, he maintained a Chinese personality, preferring to wear Chinese robes. His son Hoo Ah Yip (Chinese: 胡亞業; pinyin: Hú Yàyè), was educated in Britain. When his son snipped off his ponytail and converted to Christianity, Hoo Ah Kay was written to have been "outraged".

== Death ==
Hoo Ah Kay died on 27 March 1880, aged 64. A housing estate, Whampoa located in the subzone of Balestier, which is a part of Novena planning area in Singapore is named after him.

== Popular culture ==
Hoo Ah Kay appears in George MacDonald Fraser's historical novel Flashman's Lady and in The Hills of Singapore by Dawn Farnham.

== Bibliography ==
- Godley, Michael R. (2002). The Mandarin-Capitalists from Nanyang: Overseas Chinese Enterprise in the Modernisation of China 1893–1911. Cambridge University Press. ISBN 9780521526951.
