= Shophouse =

Building serving both as a residence and a commercial business

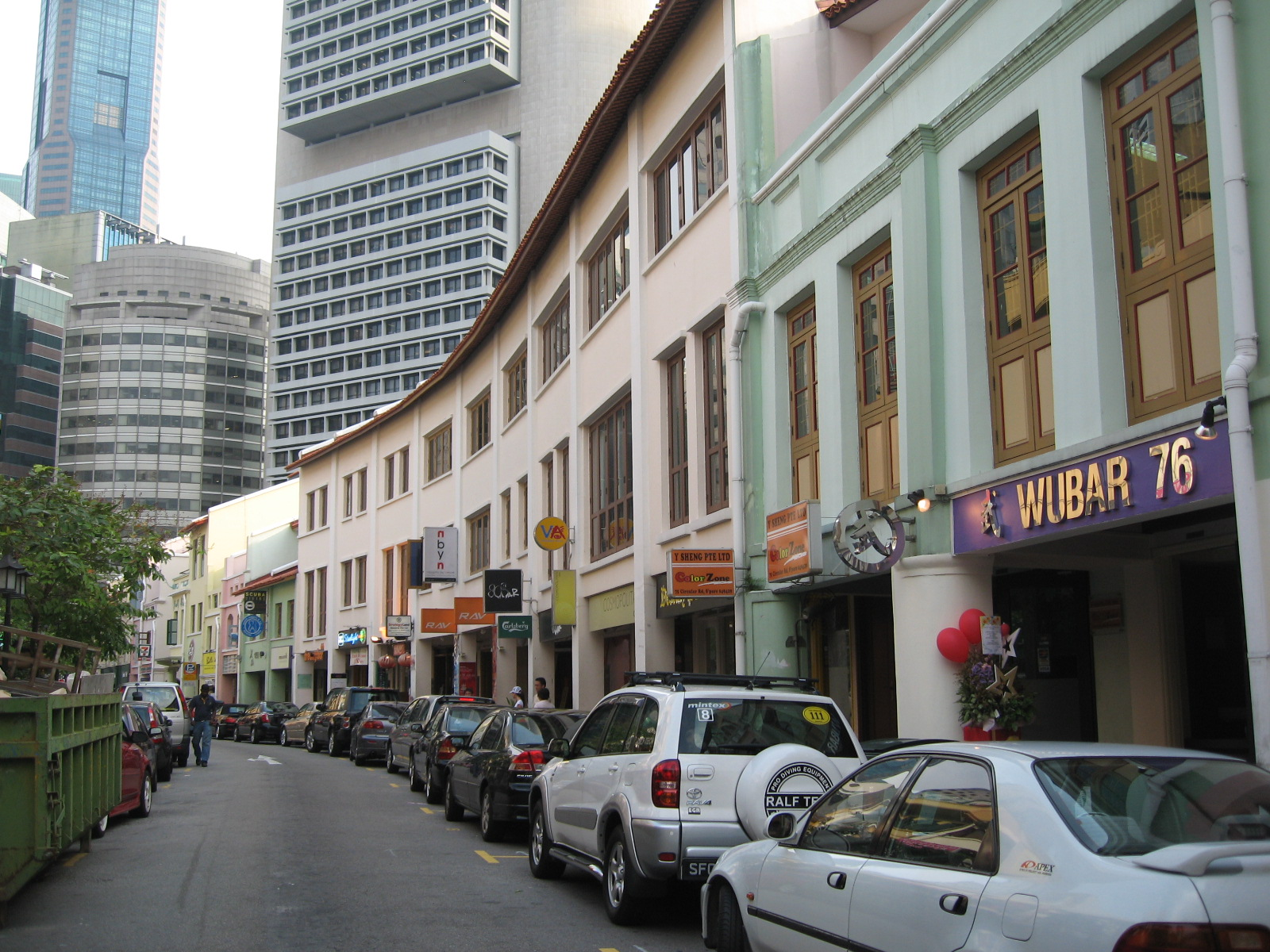
A terraced layout allows a row of shophouses to extend as long as a city block permits, as exemplified by this long row of shophouses in Singapore. All the shophouses are linked by a covered passageway called the five-foot way at the front.

A shophouse is a building type serving both as a residence and a commercial business. It is defined in the dictionary as a building type found in Southeast Asia that is "a shop opening on to the pavement and also used as the owner's residence", and became a commonly used term since the 1950s. Variations of the shophouse may also be found in other parts of Asia; in Southern China, Hong Kong, and Macau, it is found in a building type known as Tong lau, and in towns and cities in Sri Lanka. They stand in a terraced house configuration, often fronted with arcades or colonnades, which present a unique townscape in Southeast Asia, Sri Lanka, and South China.

== Design and features ==
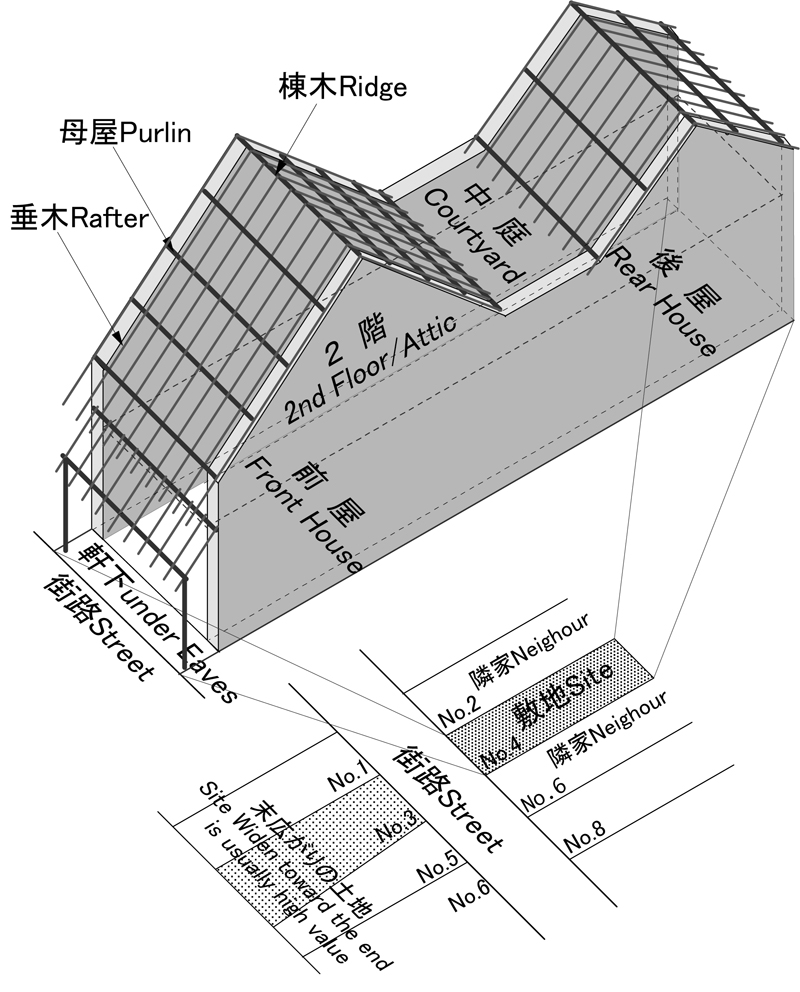
Shophouse prototype

- Site and plan: Shophouses were a convenient design for urban settlers, providing both a residence and small business venue. Shophouses were often designed to be narrow and deep so that many businesses can be accommodated along a street. Each building's footprint was narrow in width and long in depth. The front area along the street was formal space for customers, while the rear areas were informal spaces for family members, toilets, bathrooms, kitchens, and infrastructure.
- Veranda: Merchandise was displayed in front of the house, and was protected by a veranda from rain and sunshine. The veranda also served as reception for customers. The veranda along the street was an important area for the house owner and customers. Unless there was a communal arrangement, verandas may not connected to each other to form continuous colonnades. Where the colonnades are present by design, they form the five foot way.
- Courtyard and upper floor: Traditional shophouses may have between one and three floors. The shophouse was usually built between parallel masonry party walls. The upper part of the house was used as living quarters. To ensure air circulation, an inner "courtyard" (air-well) was placed midway between the front and rear of the house.
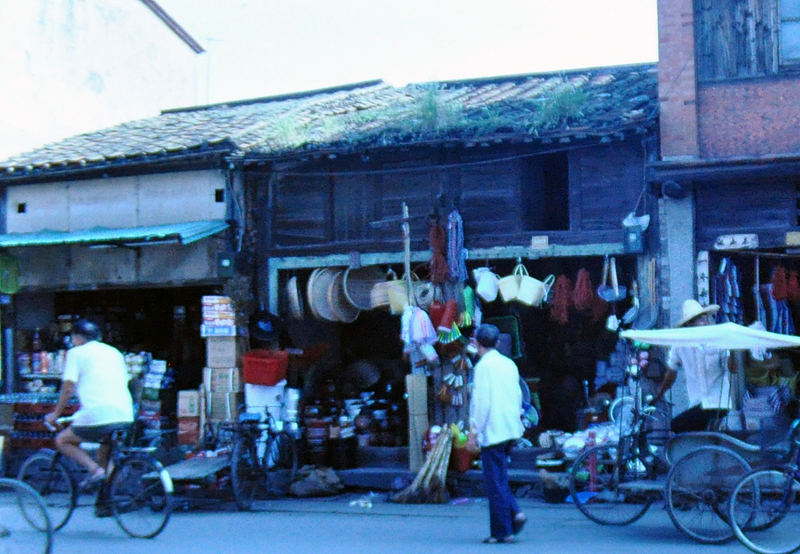
Shophouse, Quanzhou, China, 1992

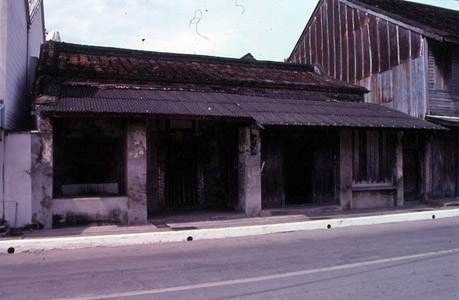
Shophouse, Pattani, Thailand, 1992

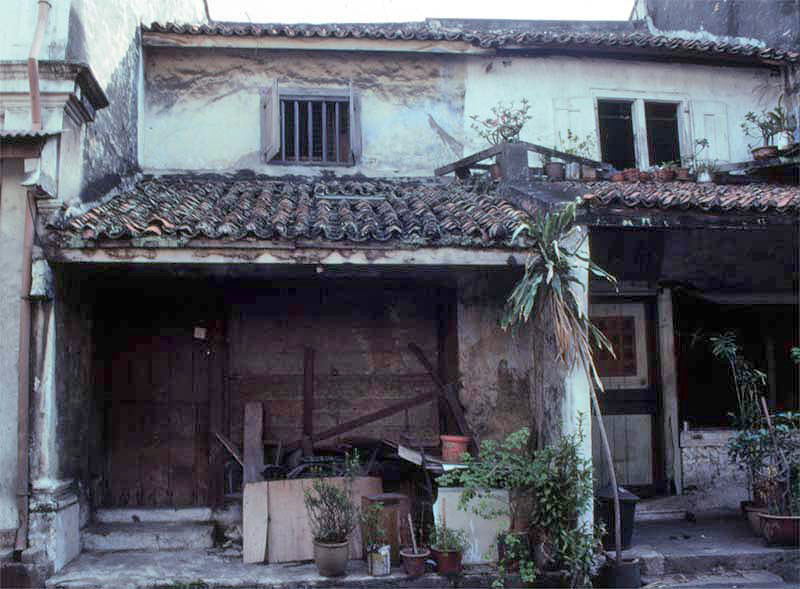
Shophouse, Melaka, Malaysia, 1992

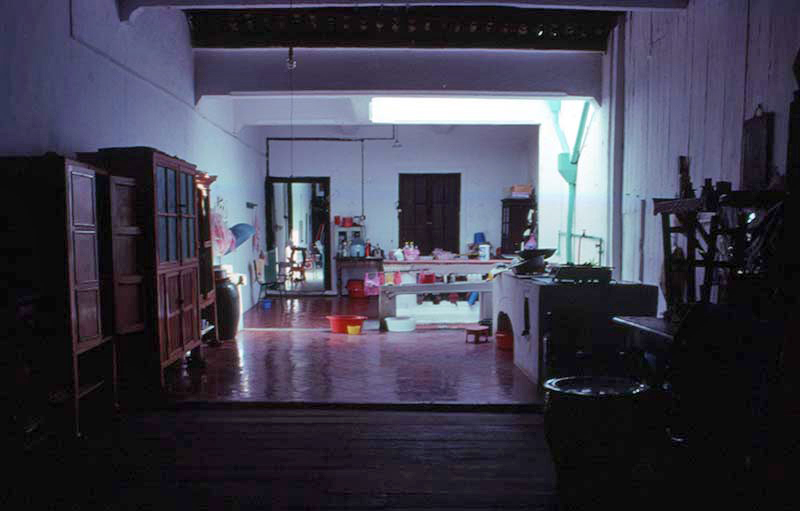
Shophouse courtyard, Melaka, Malaysia, 1990

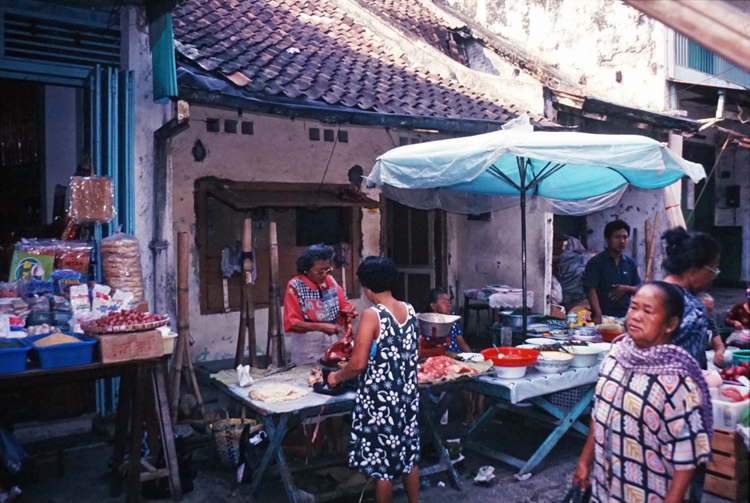
Shophouse in Pecinan, Semarang, 1991

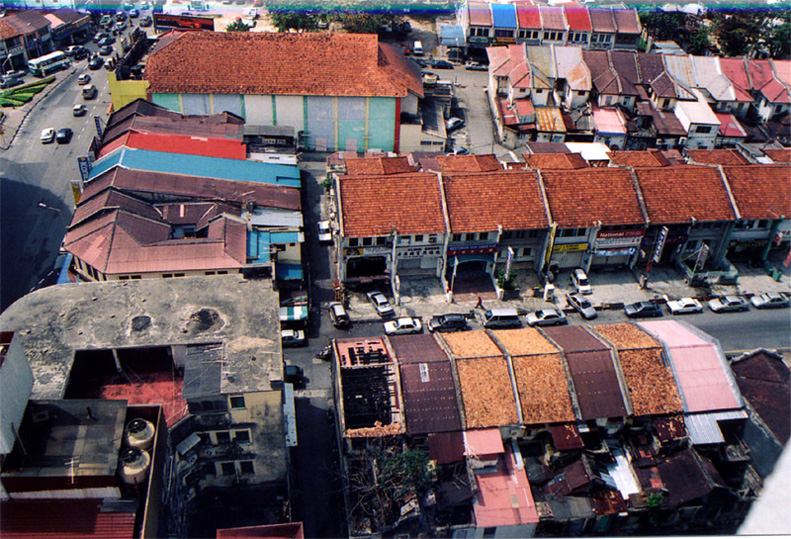
Colonial shophouses with Back Lane in George Town, Penang, 1991

=== Covered walkways ===
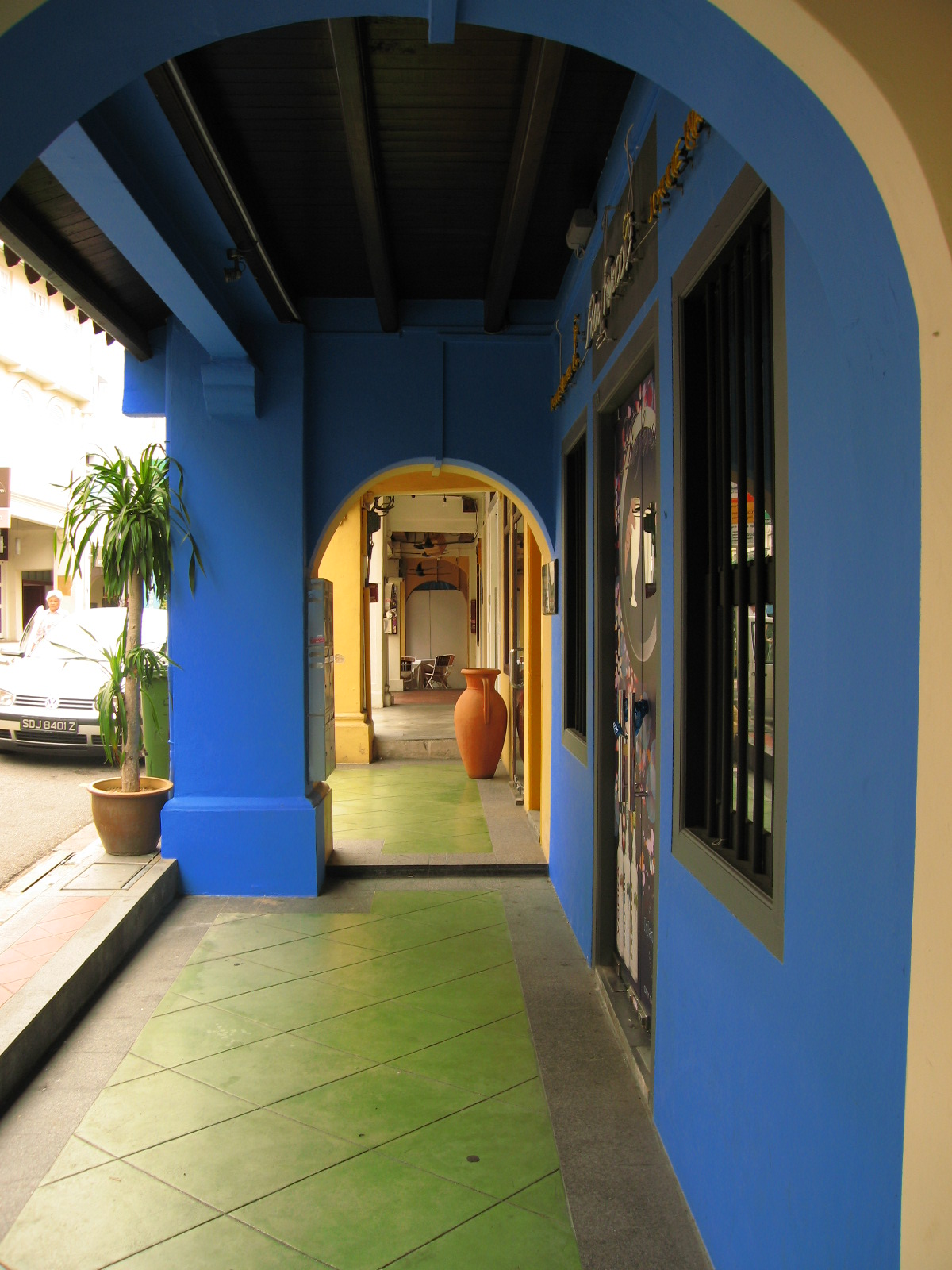
A five-foot way in Singapore

In 1822, instructions were issued by Sir Stamford Raffles for the Town Plan of Singapore which specified that each house had to provide a "verandah of a certain depth, open at all times as a continued and covered passage on each side of the street". Raffles' instructions created a regular and uniform townscape in Singapore with arcades or colonnades forming a continuous public pathways. Later in other Straits Settlements, the "continued covered passage" known as "five foot way" was also mandated, and it became a distinctive feature of the "Strait Settlement Style" buildings. This feature also spread to other South East Asian countries after the mid-19th century such as Thailand and the Philippines, as well as some East Asian countries.

Covered walkways are found in a building type called qilou found in Southern China, Taiwan and Hong Kong that was developed under the influence of Singaporean shophouses. In Taipei at the end of the Qing dynasty period, in Taiwan under Japanese rule, and in Southern China under the Republic of China, similar regulations were applied, mandating a wider space. In 1876, the Hong Kong colonial authority allowed the lease holder to build overhangs above the verandah (public sidewalk in Hong Kong colony) to provide more living space with no intention of creating regular and uniform townscapes.

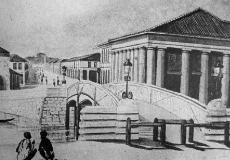
Passage with colonnades, Singapore, c. 1840

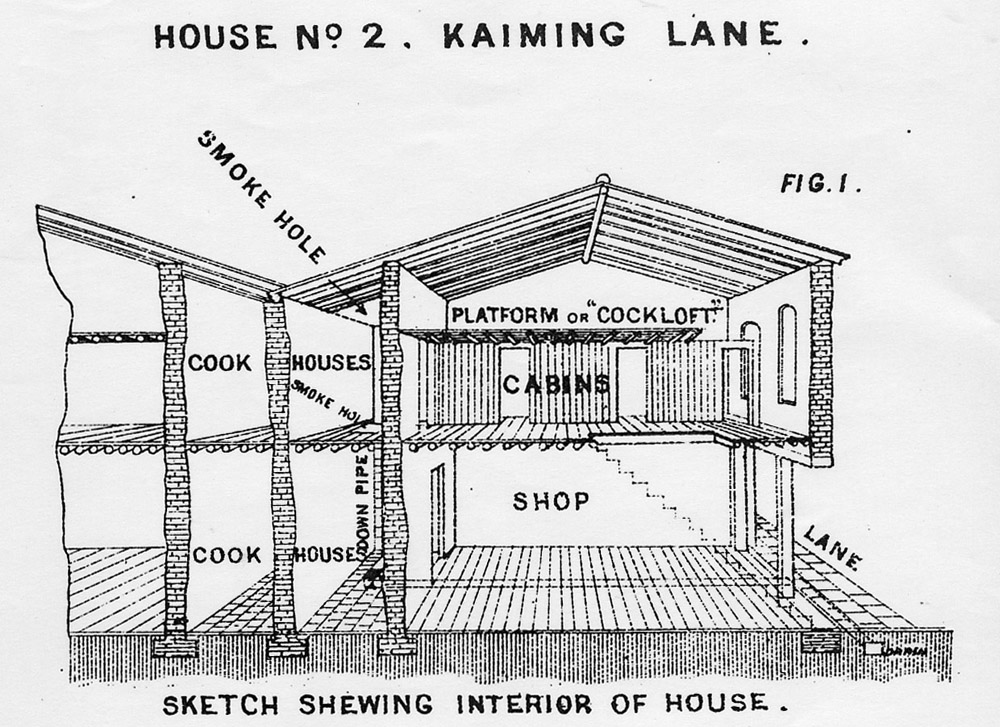
Shophouse in Hong Kong before the Verandah Regulation, O. Chadwick's Report, 1882

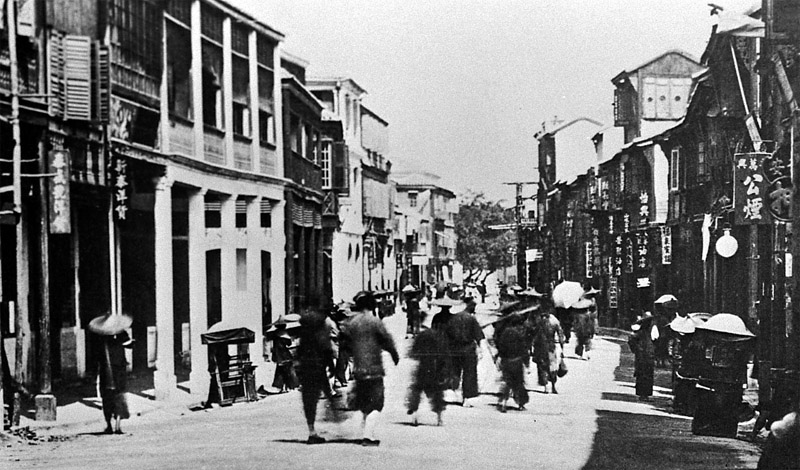
Shophouse in Hong Kong after the Verandah Regulation, c. 1905

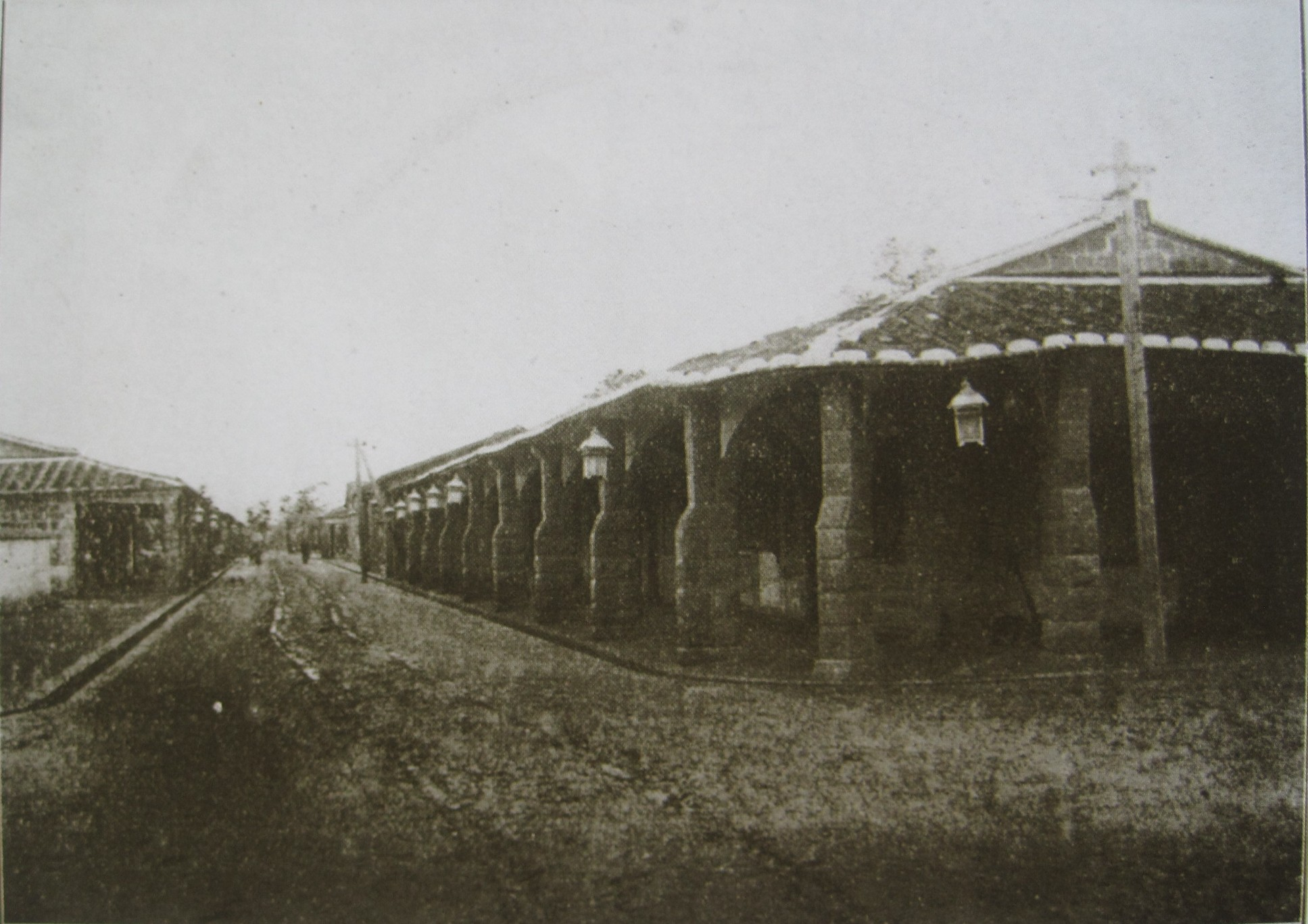
Shophouses in Cishan, Taiwan

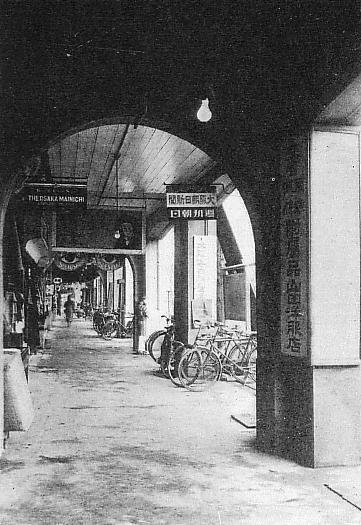
Shophouses in Taipei, Taiwan, c. 1930

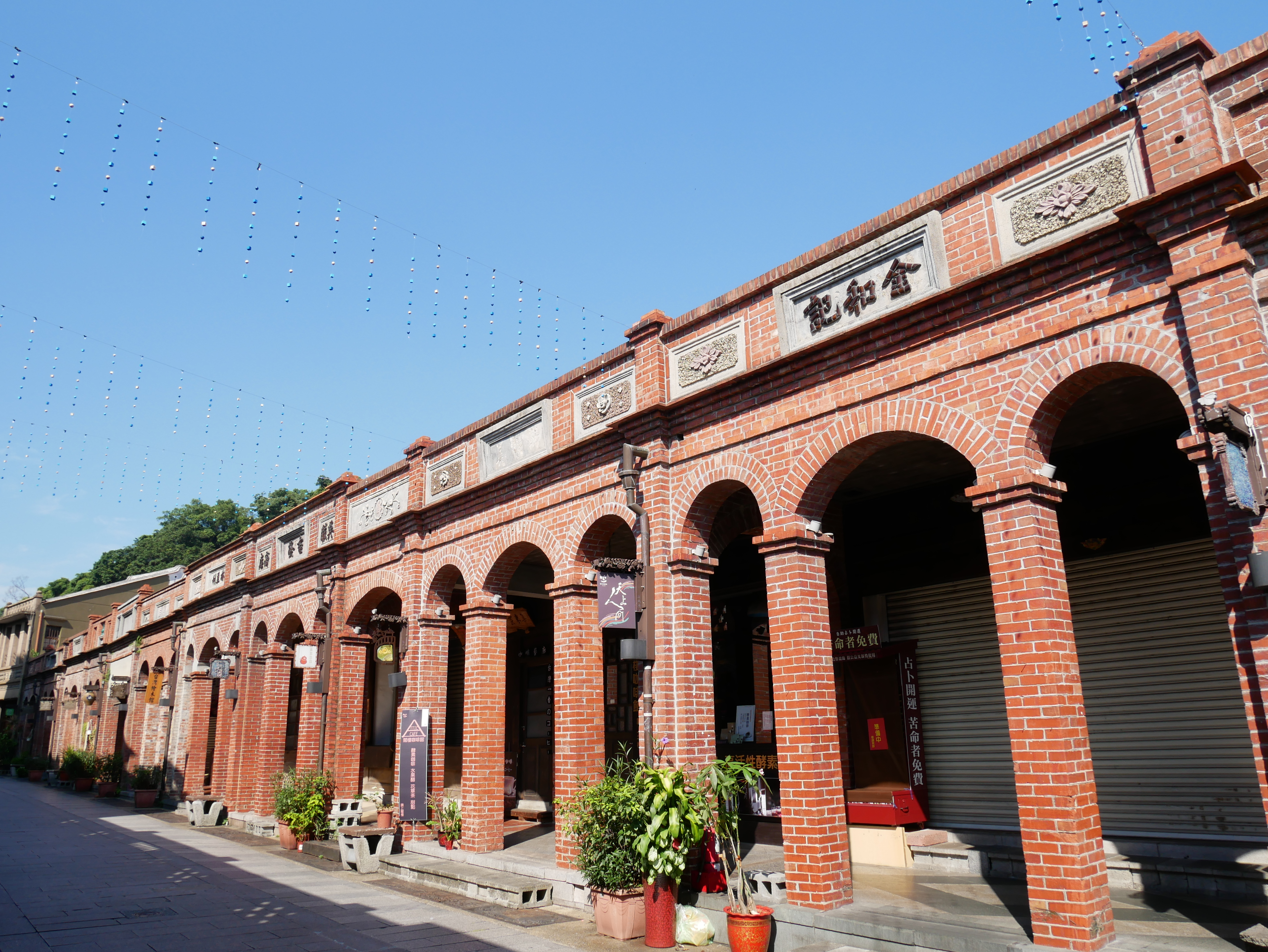
Shophouses in Sanxia, Taiwan

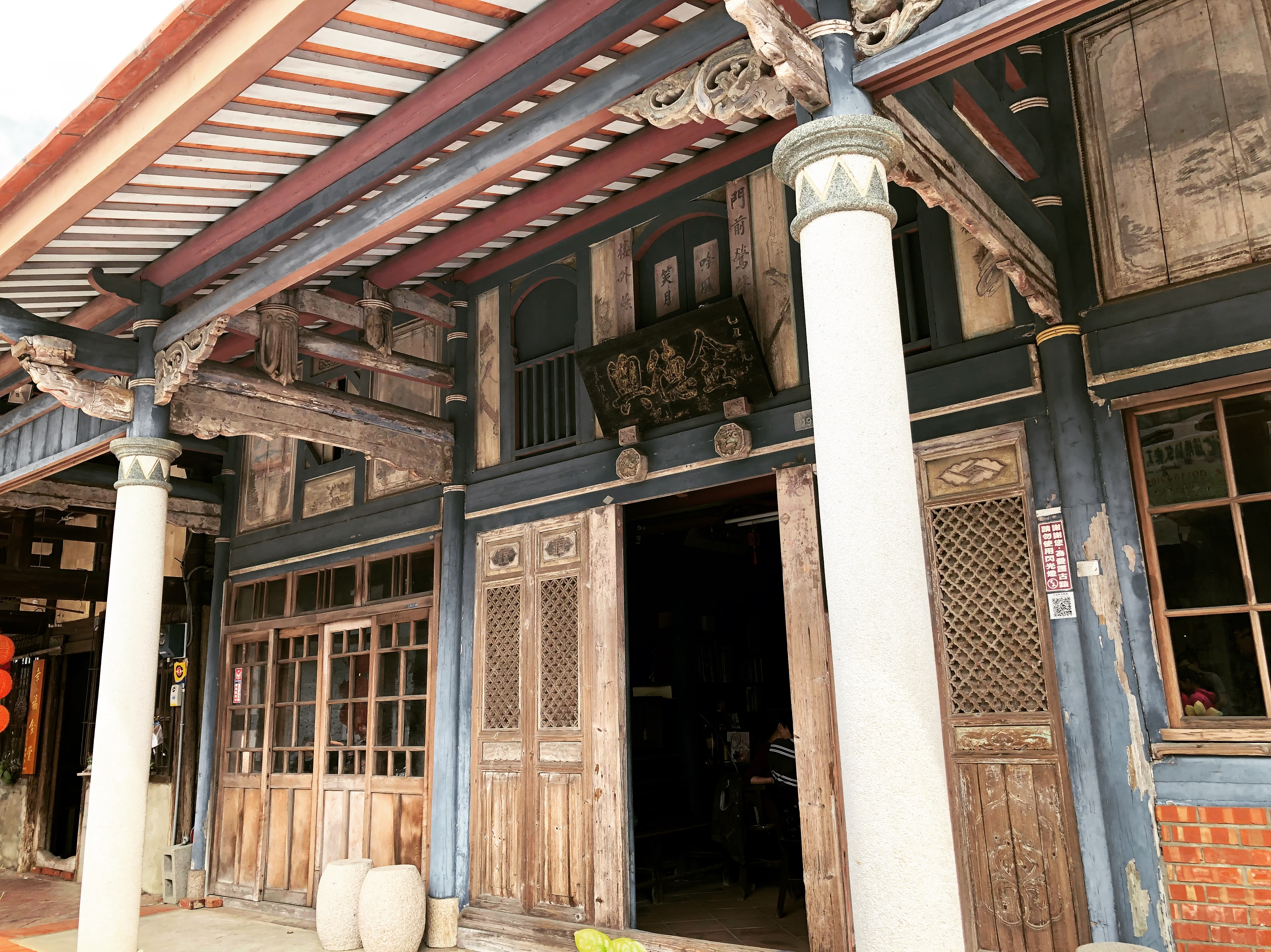
Shophouse in Jingliao, Tainan, Taiwan

=== Facade design ===
The facades of the building and sometimes the pillars may be decorated. The facade ornamentation draws inspiration from the Chinese, European, and Malay traditions, but with the European elements dominant. European neo-classical motifs include egg-and-dart moldings, and Ionic or Corinthian capitals on decorative pilasters. The degree of a shophouse's ornamentation depended on the prosperity of its owner and the surrounding area; shophouse facades in cities and (former) boom towns are generally more elaborate than spartan rural shophouses.

Masonry-heavy Art Deco and Streamline Moderne styles eventually prevailed between the 1930s and 1950s. Modern variations through the 1950s up to the 1980s were devoid of ornamental decorations, and tended to be designed with imposing geometrical and utilitarian forms inspired by International and Brutalist styles. Beginning in the 1990s, buildings began to adopt postmodern and revival styles.

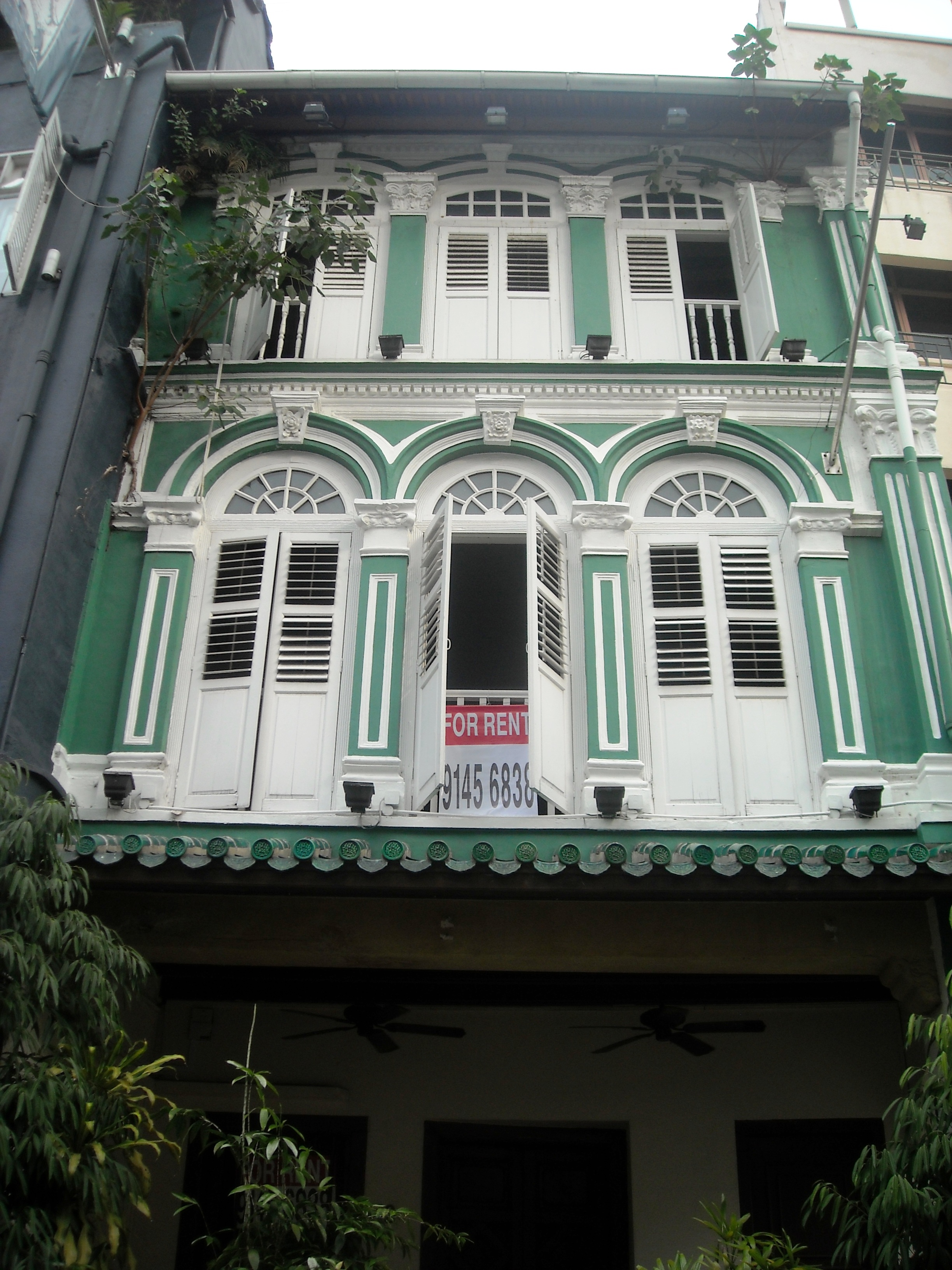
Shophouse in Singapore

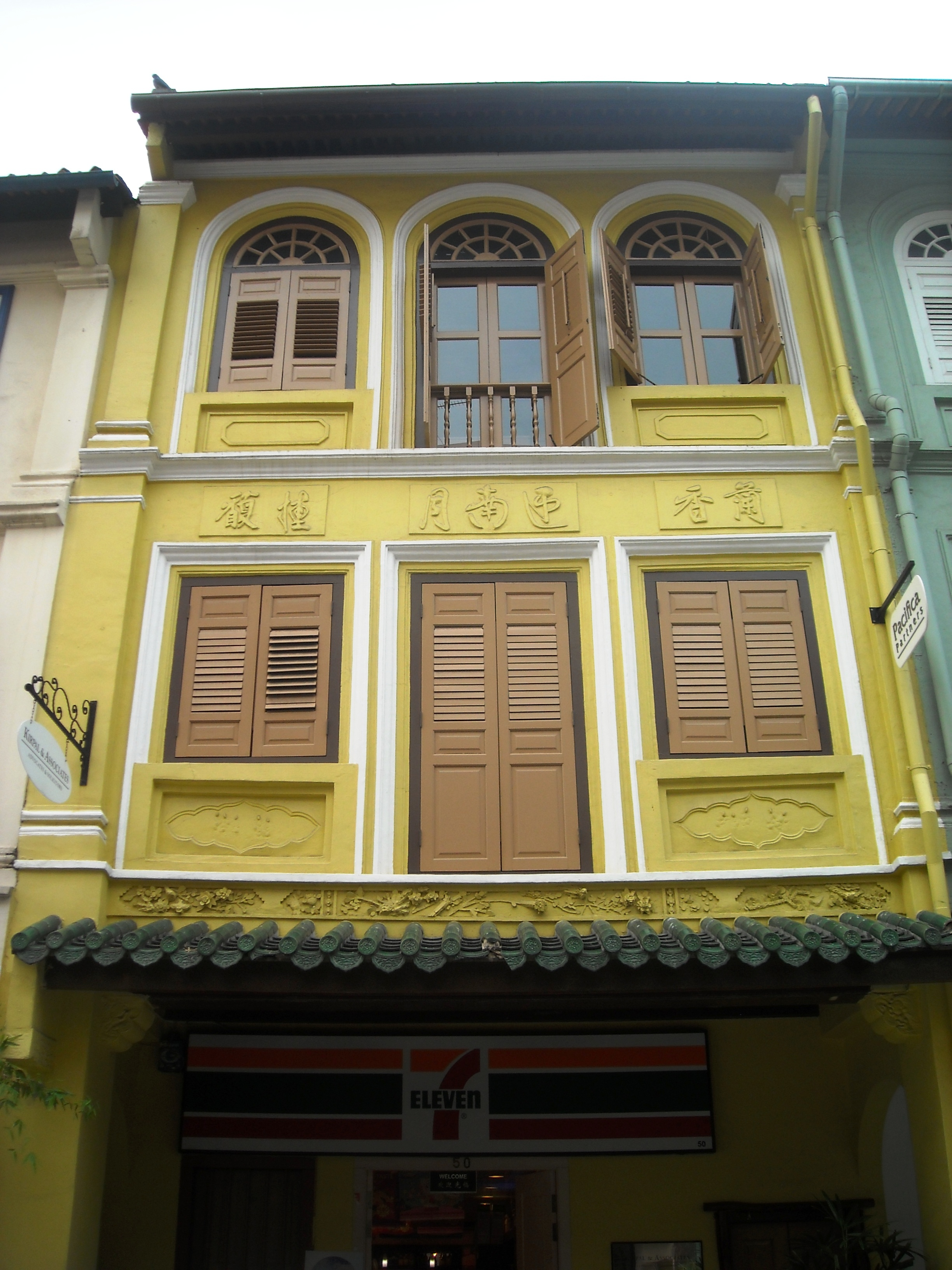
Shophouse in Singapore

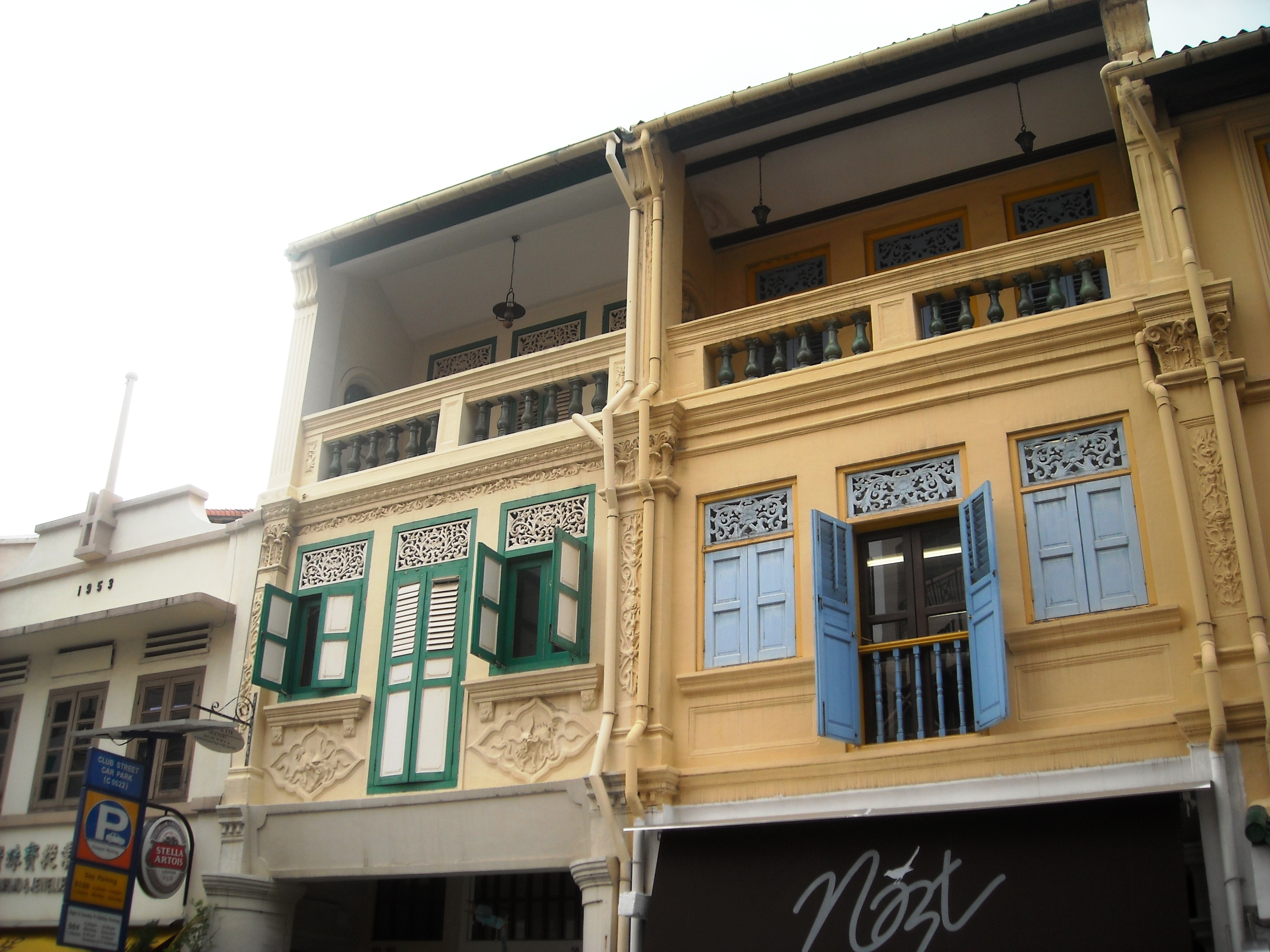
Shophouses in Singapore

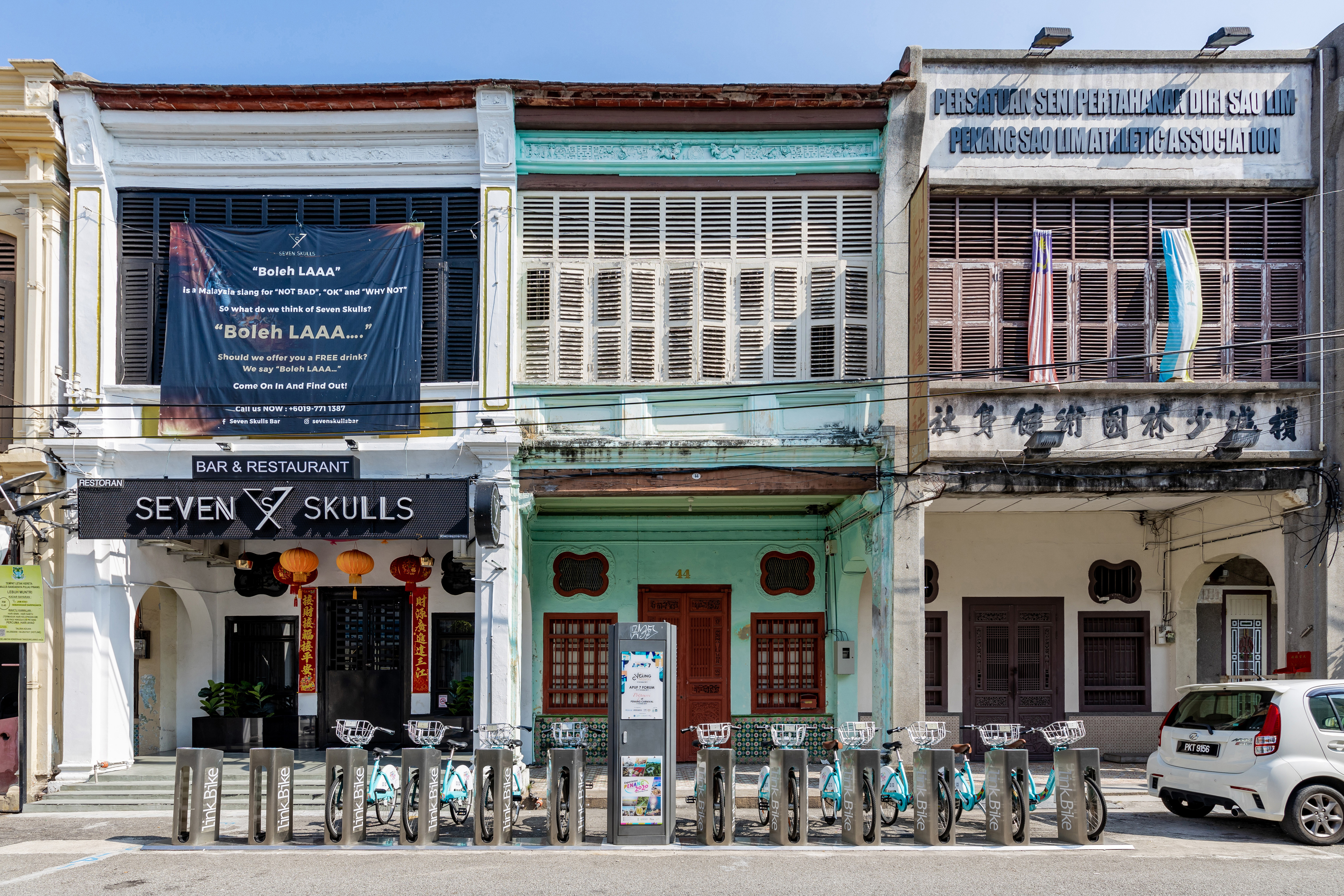
Shophouses in Penang

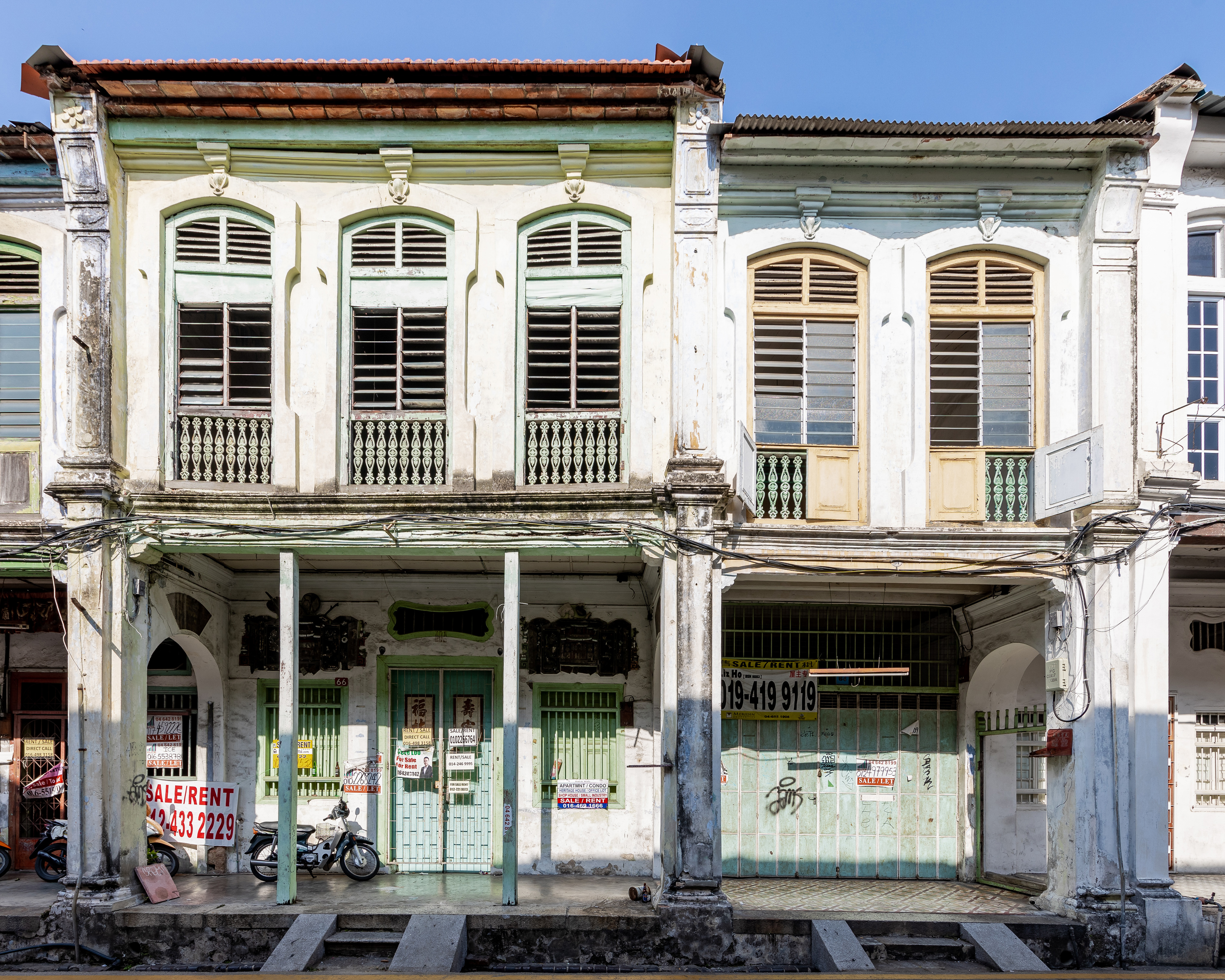
Shophouses in Penang

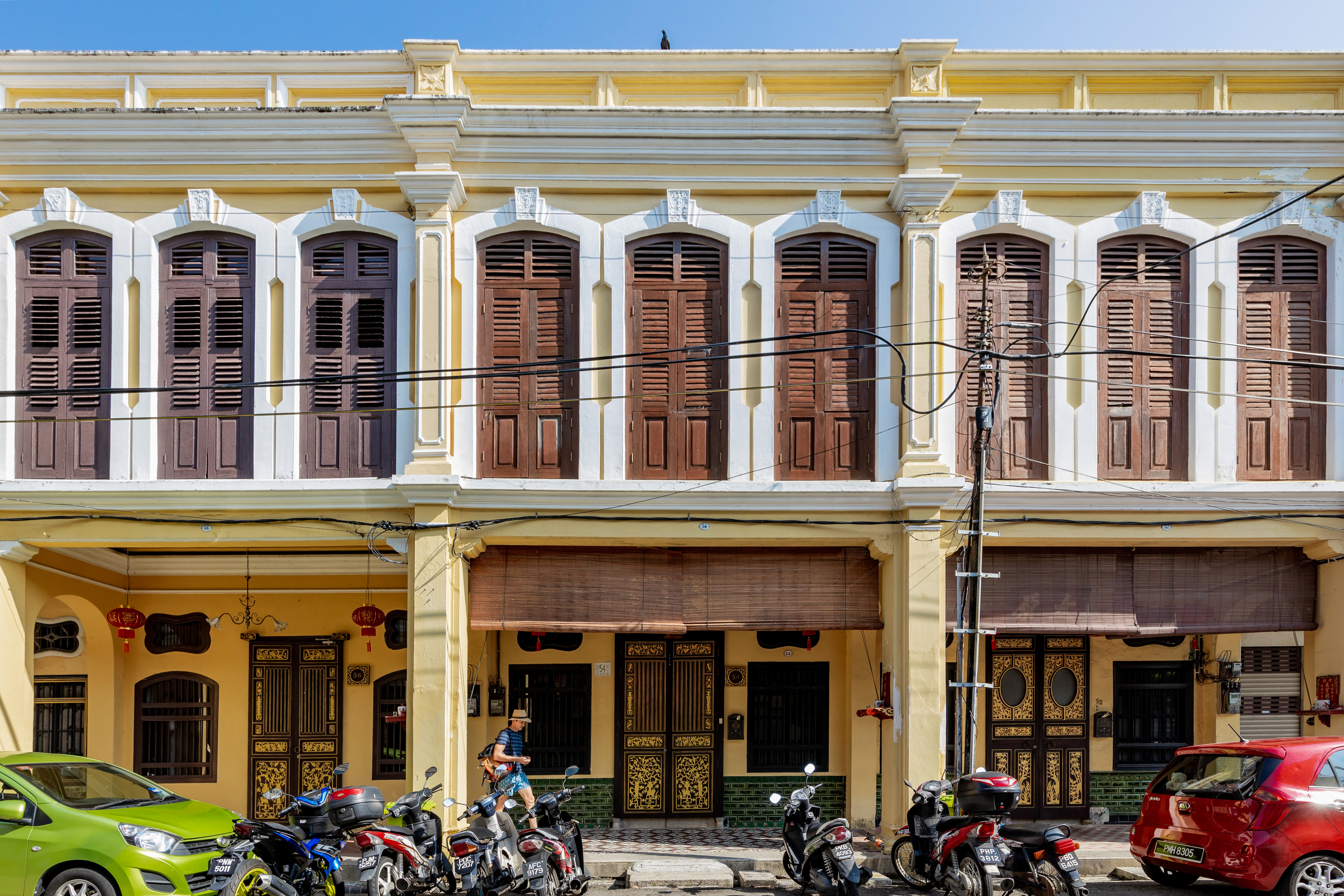
Shophouses in Penang

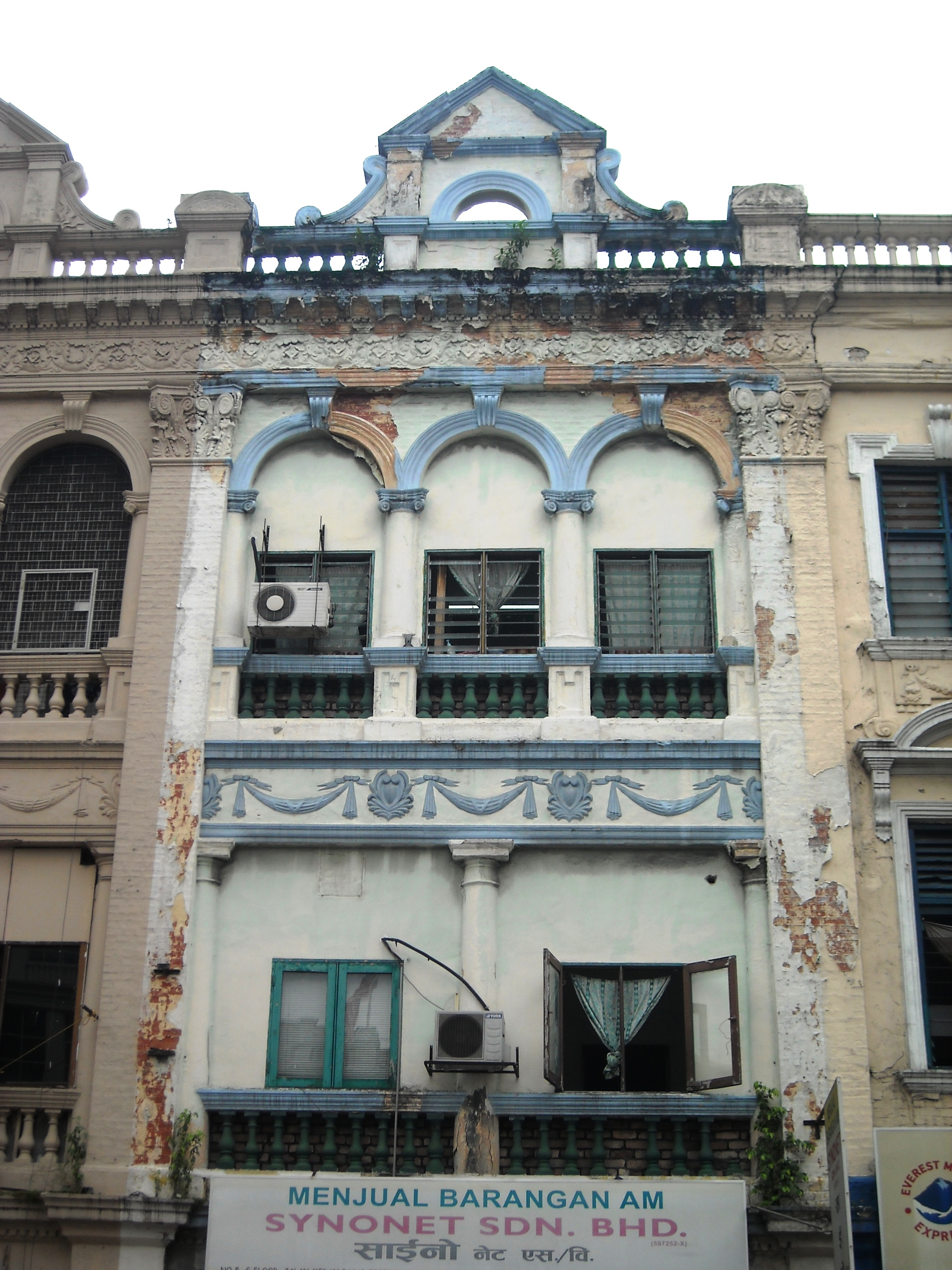
Shophouse in Kuala Lumpur

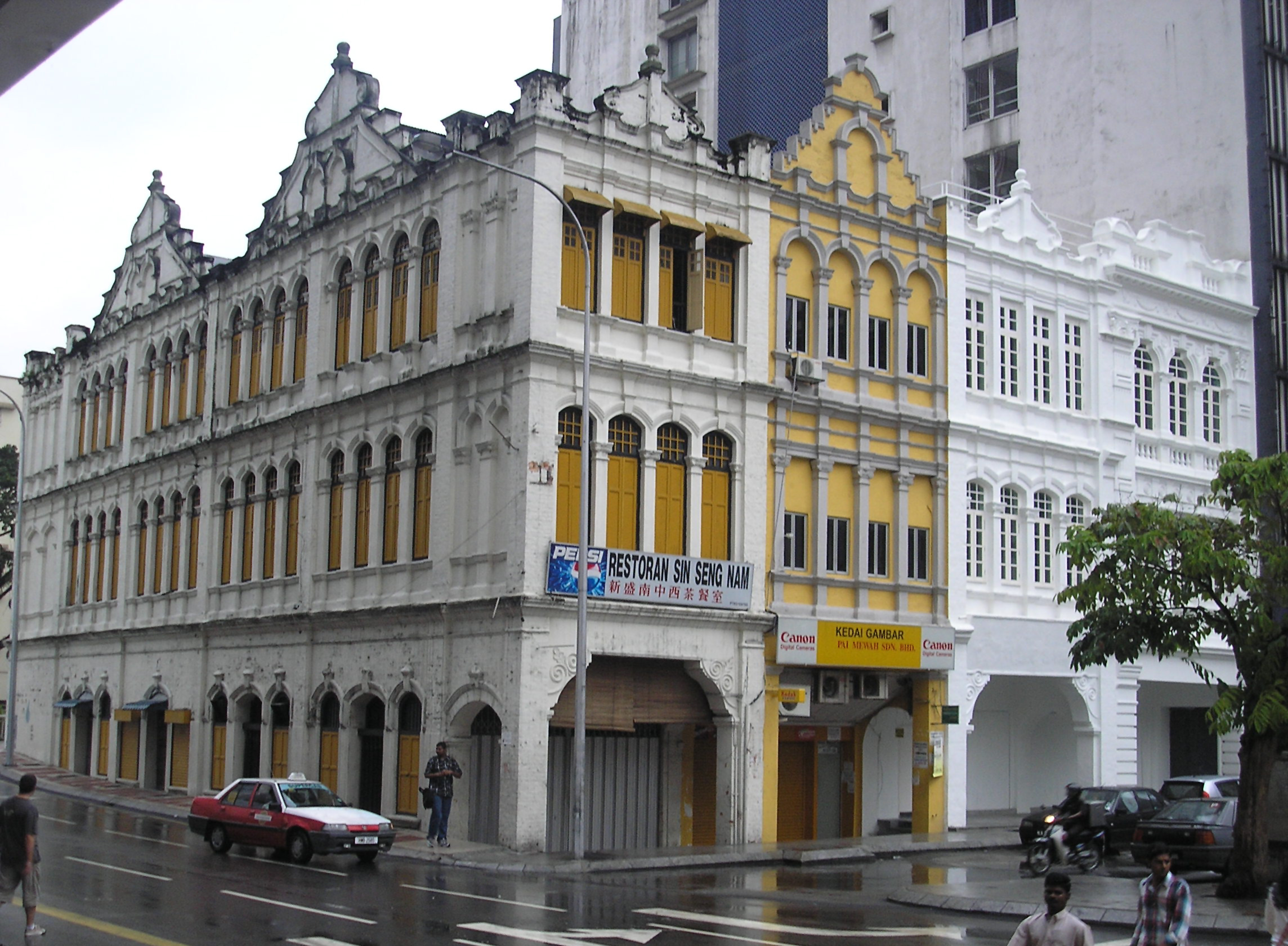
Shophouse in Kuala Lumpur

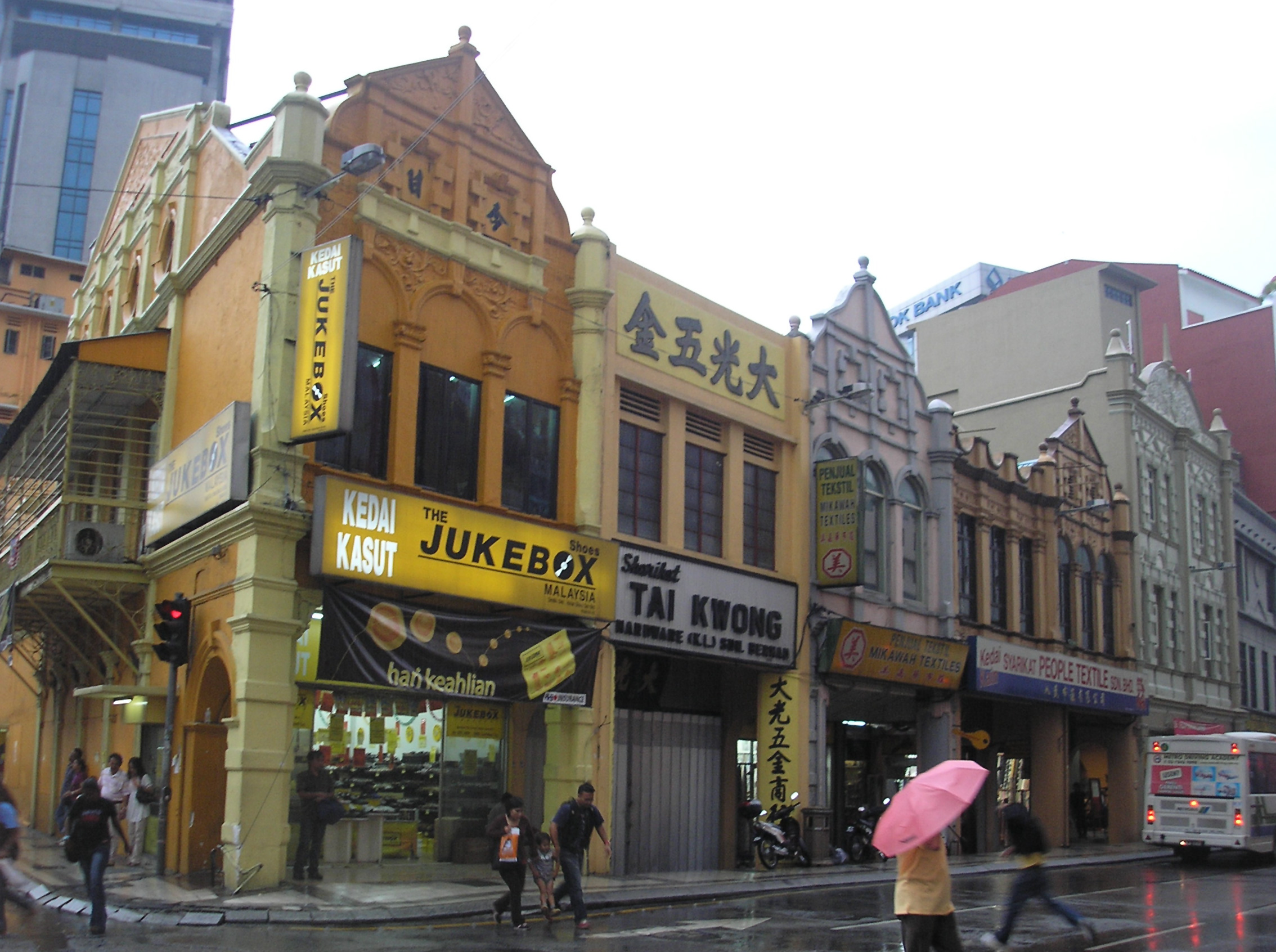
Shophouses in Kuala Lumpur

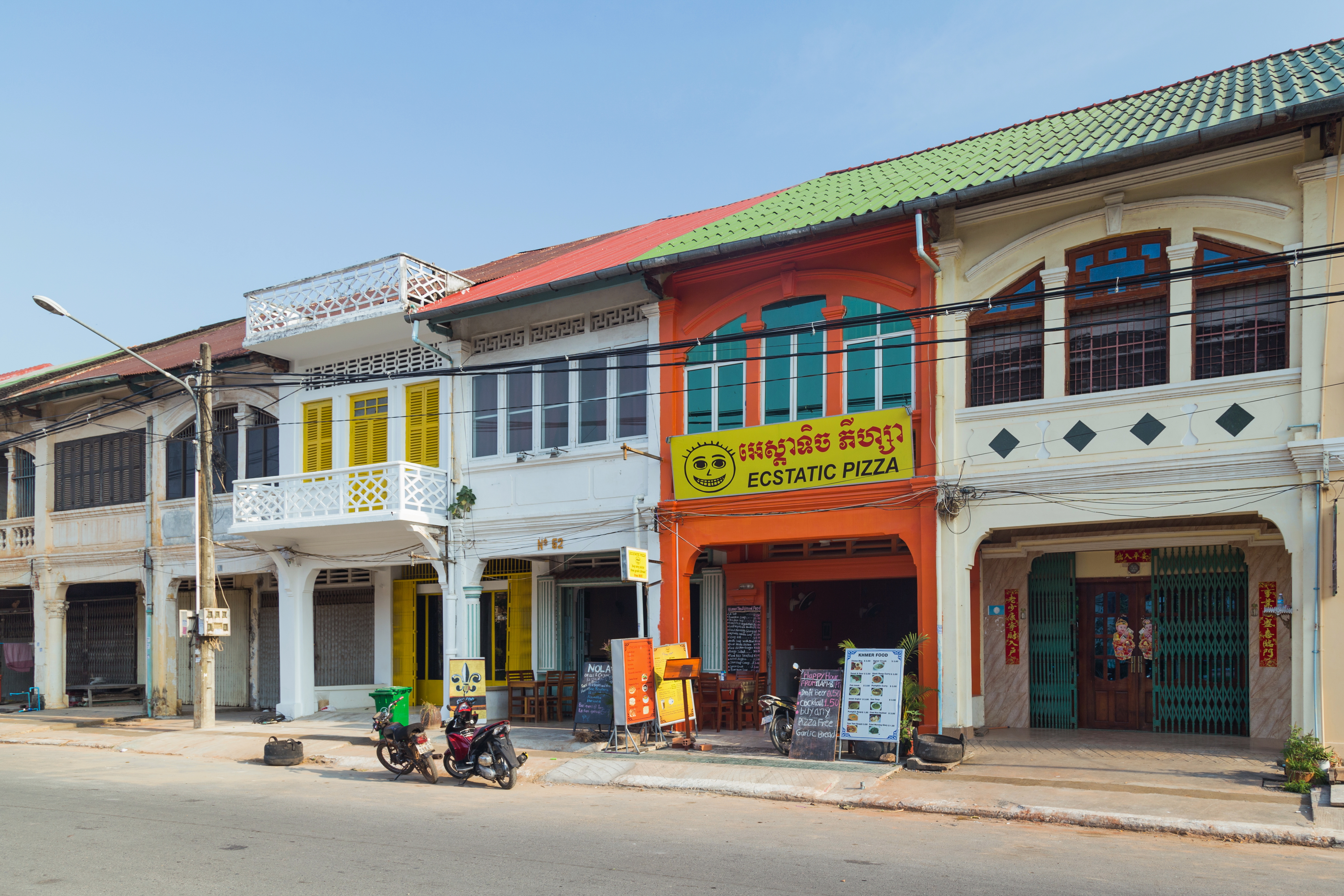
Shophouses, Kampot, Cambodia

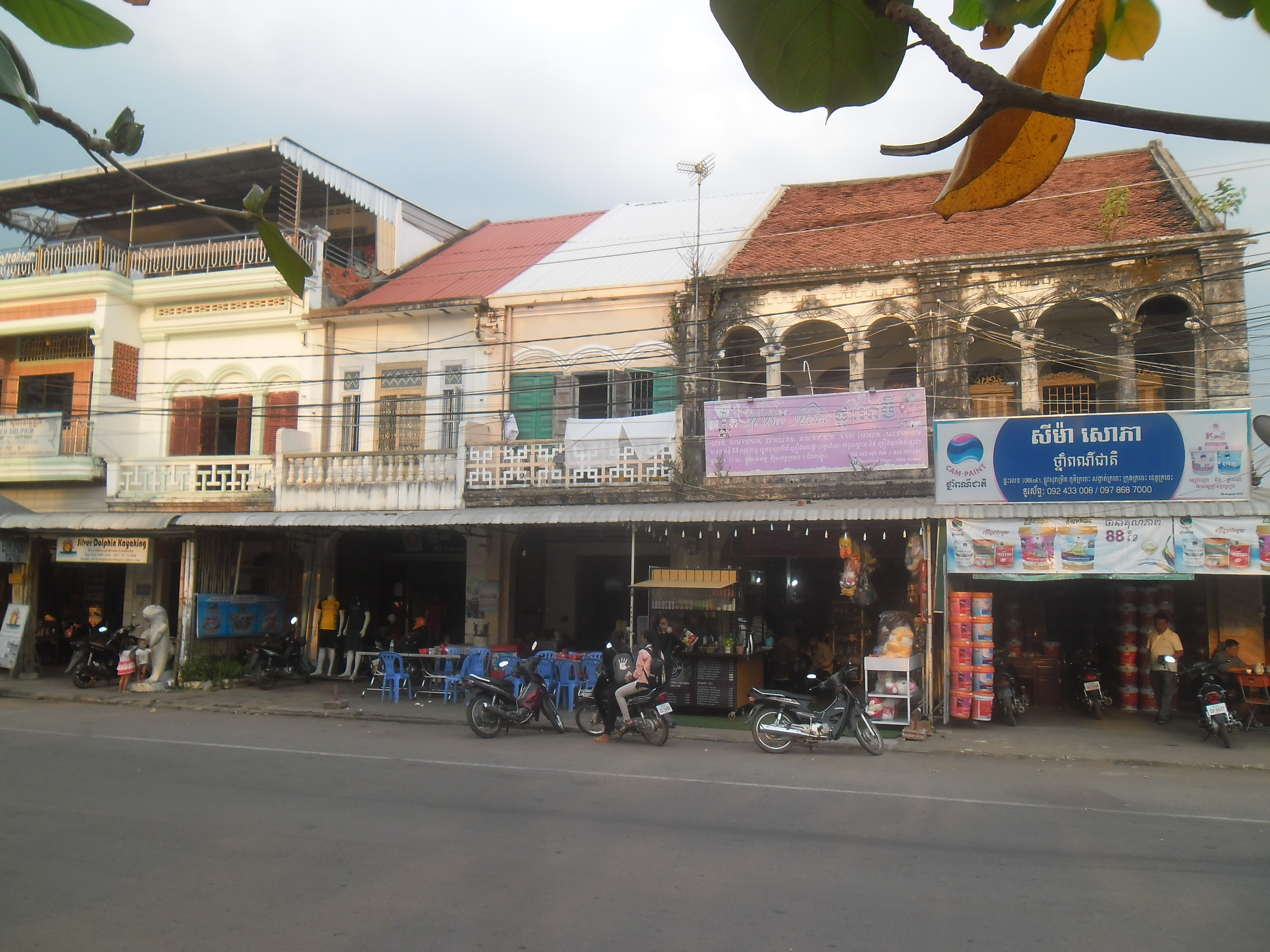
Shophouses, Kratie, Cambodia

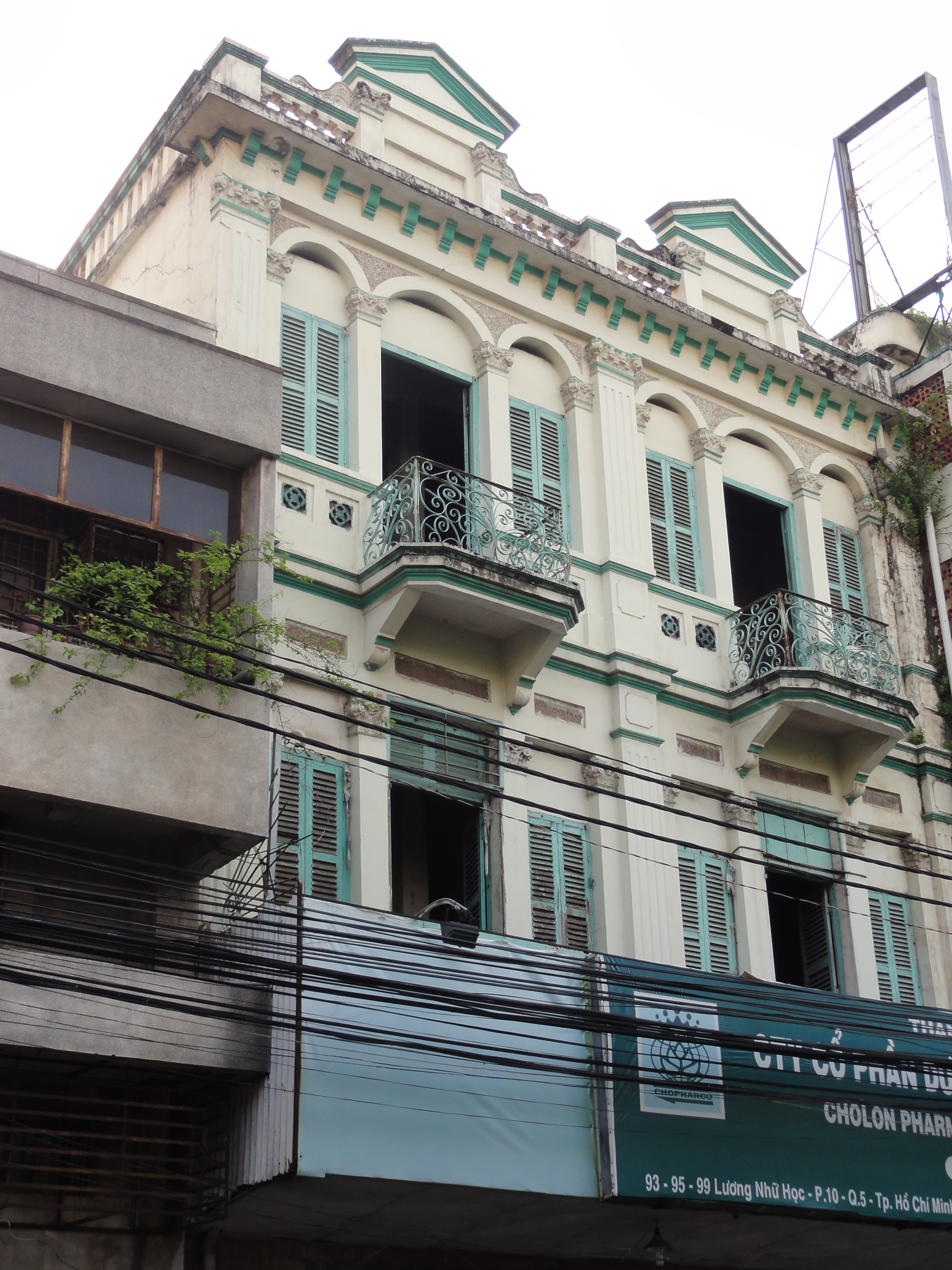
Shophouses in Cho Lon, Vietnam

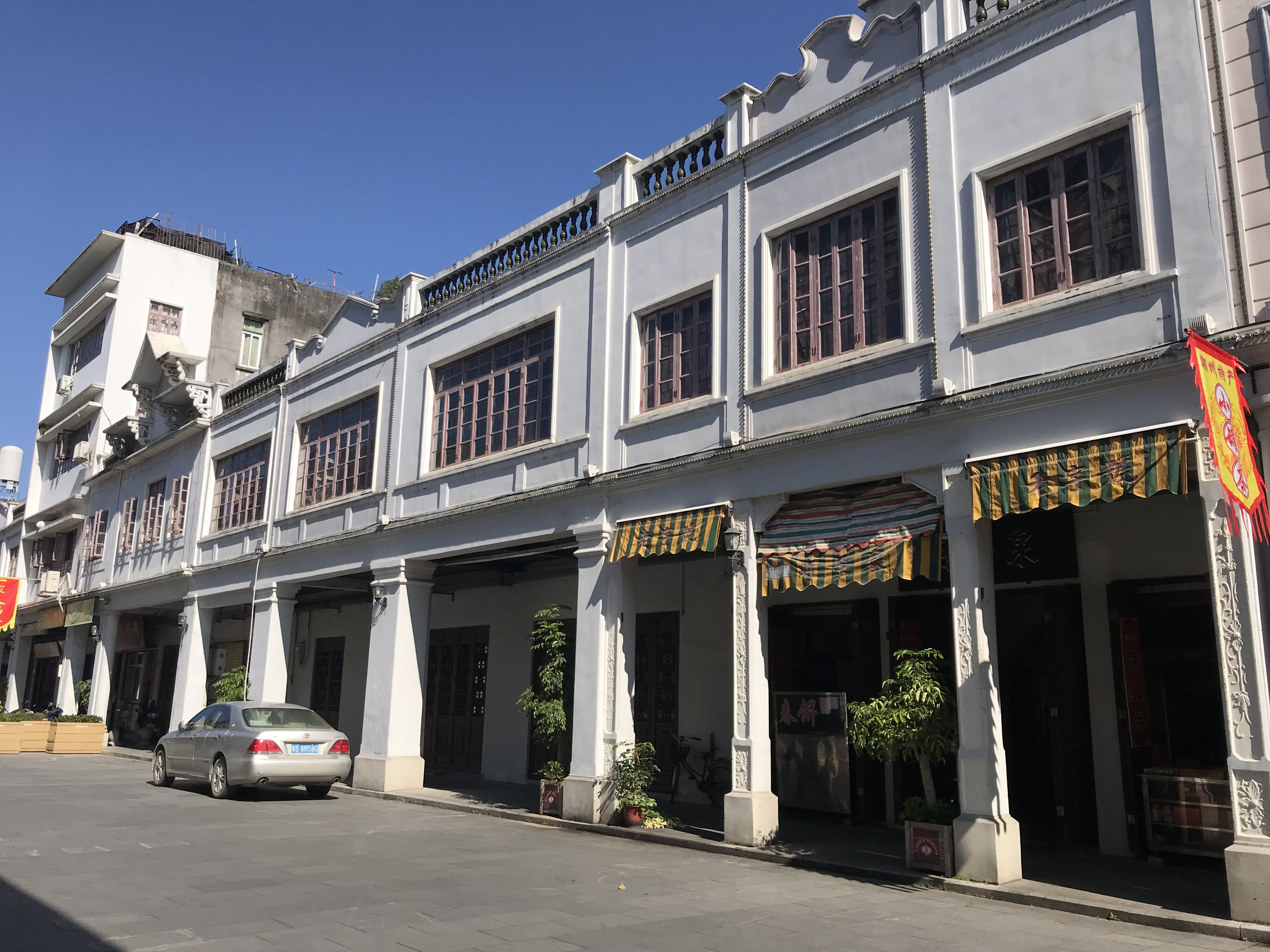
Shophouses, Paifang Street, Chaozhou

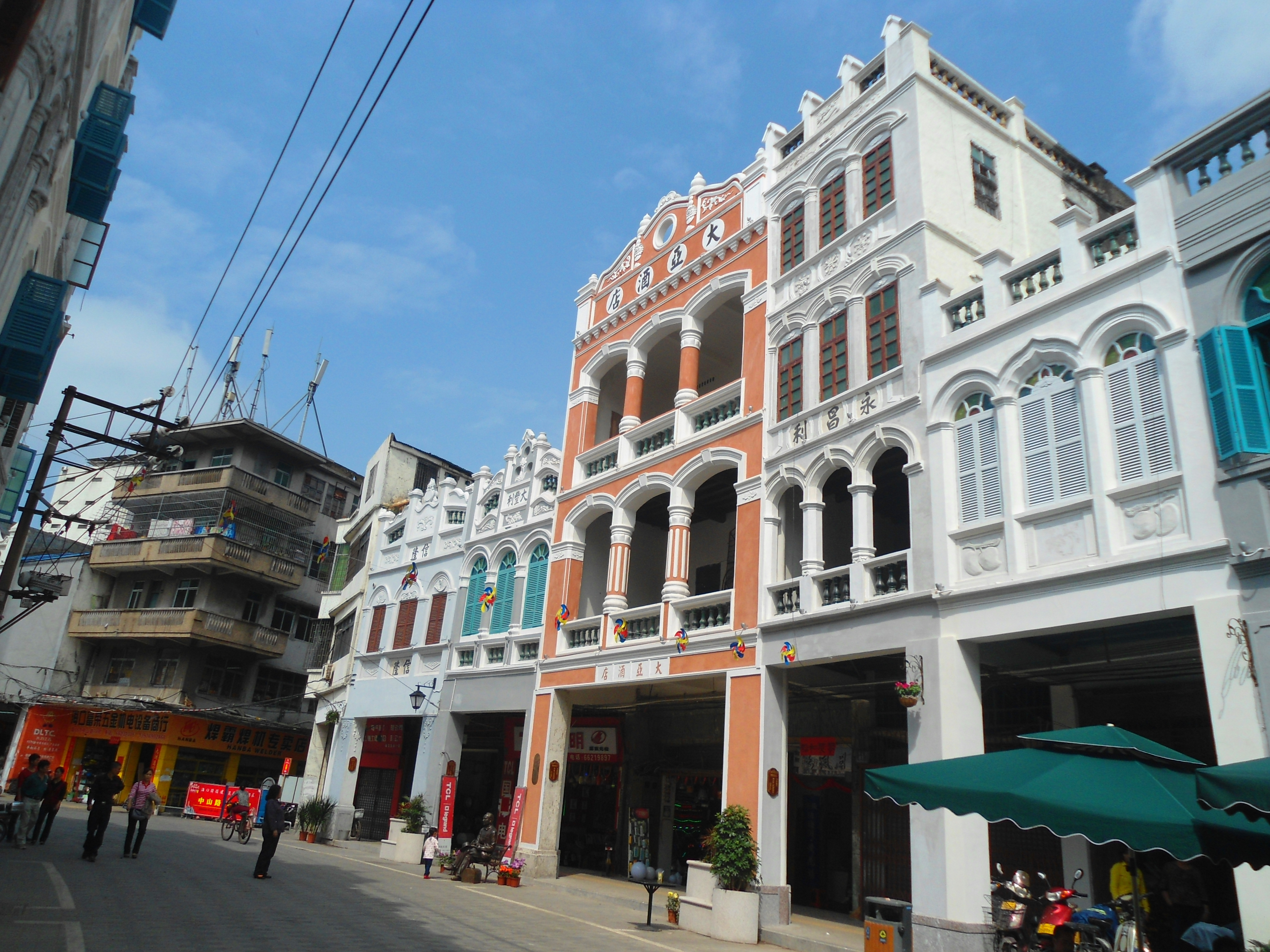
Zhongshan Road, Haikou

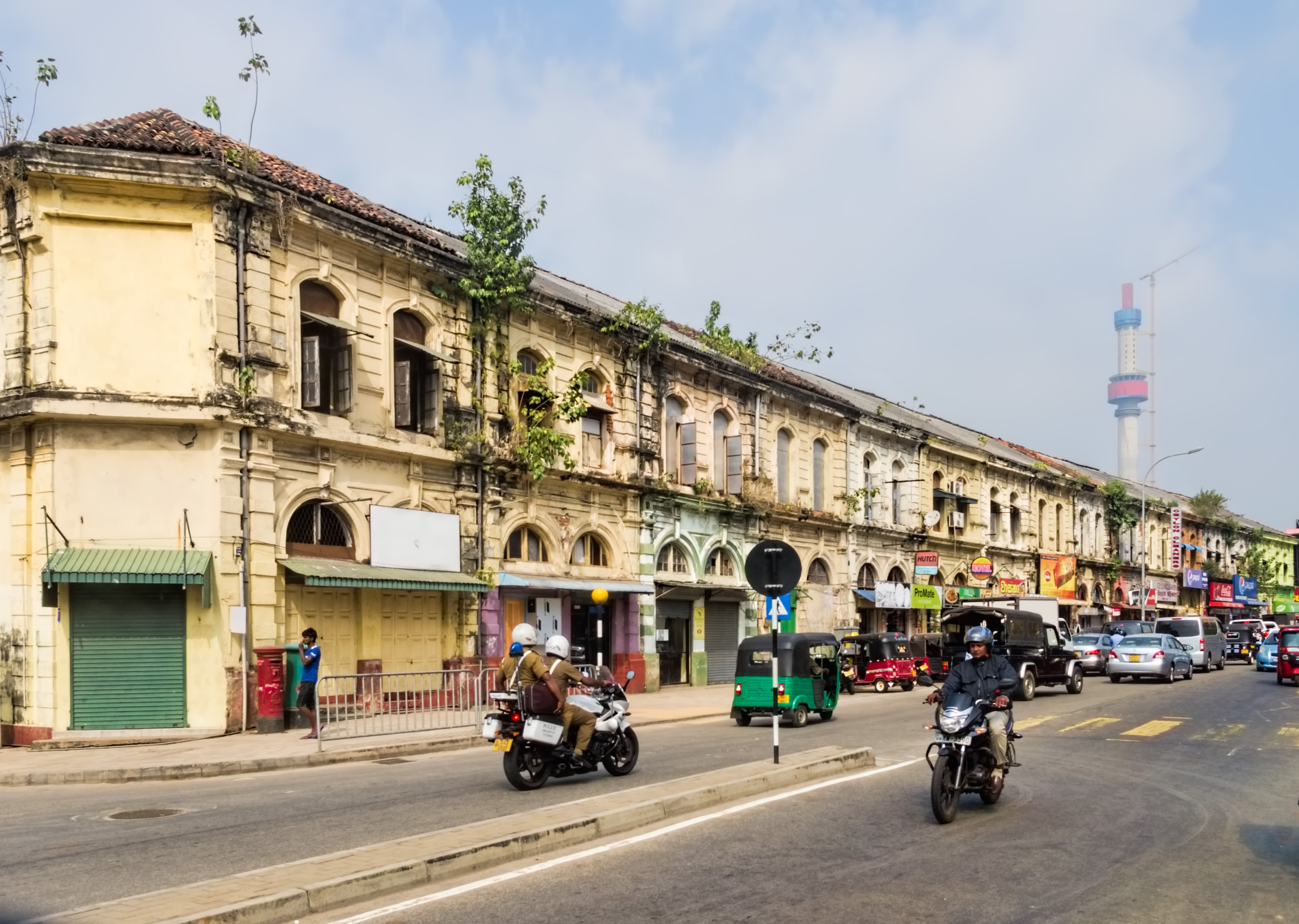
Shophouses, Colombo, Sri Lanka

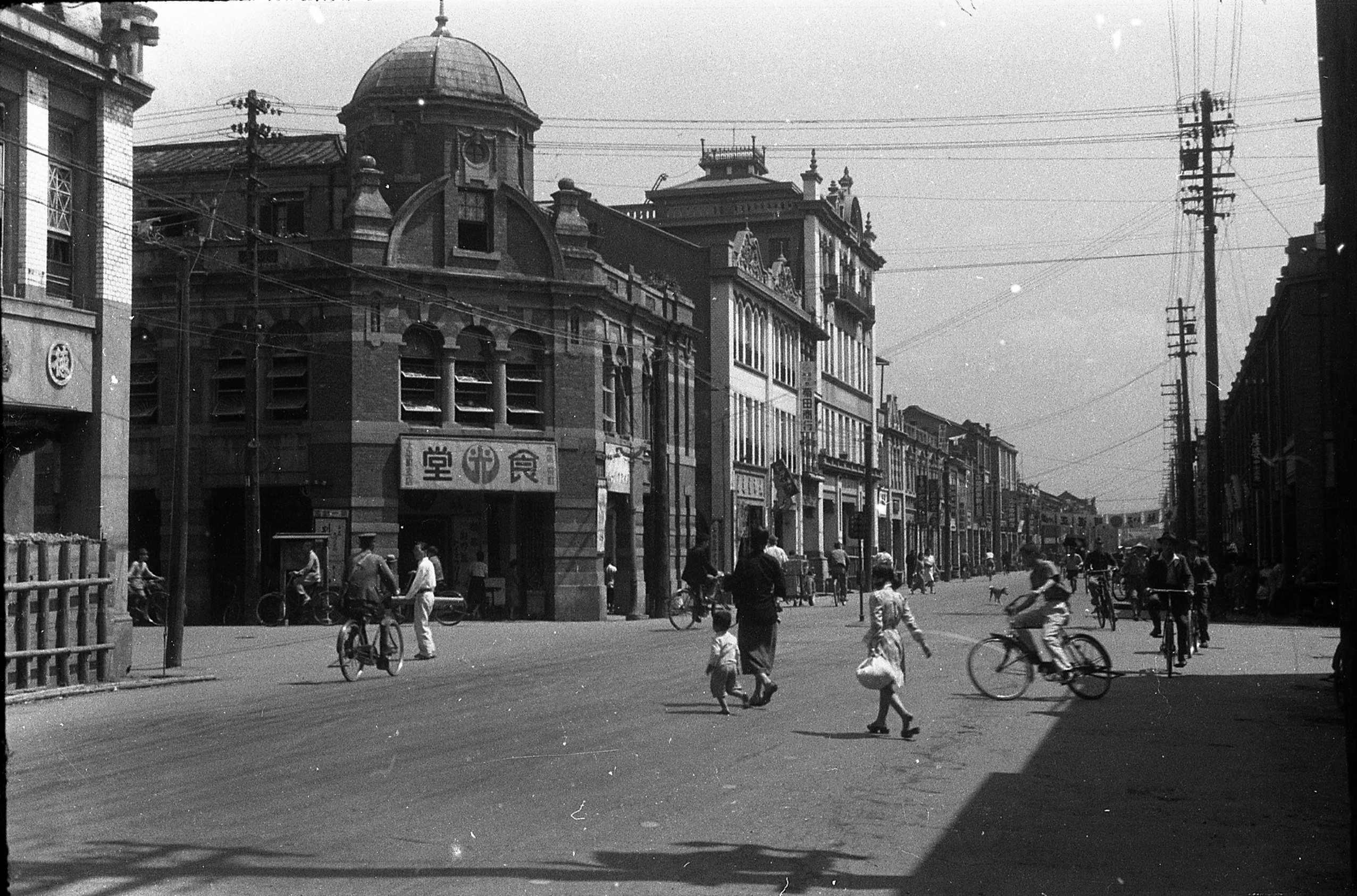
Shophouses in Twatutia, Taiwan, c. 1940

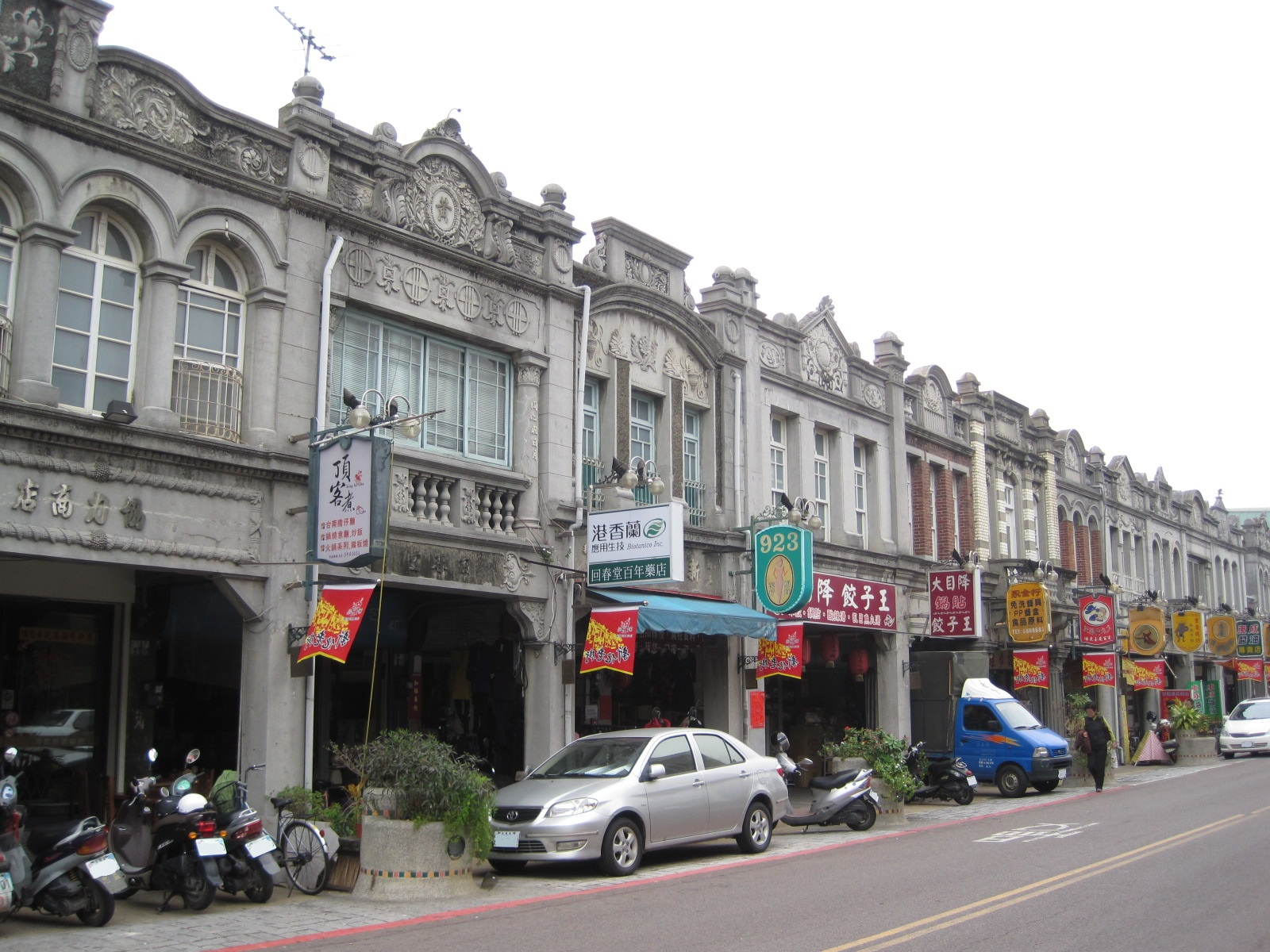
Shophouses in Xinhua Old Street, Taiwan.

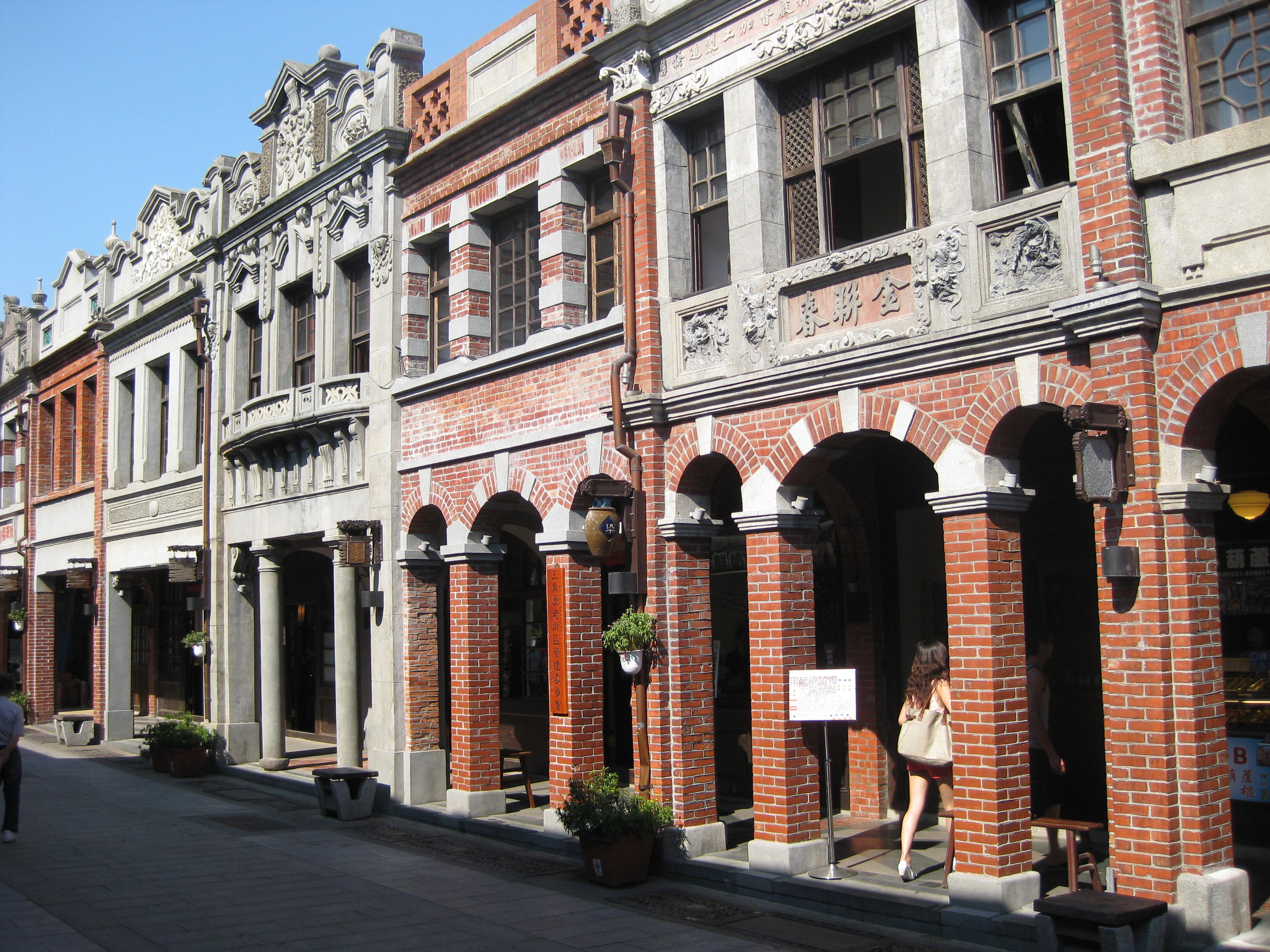
Shophouses in Sanxia, Taiwan

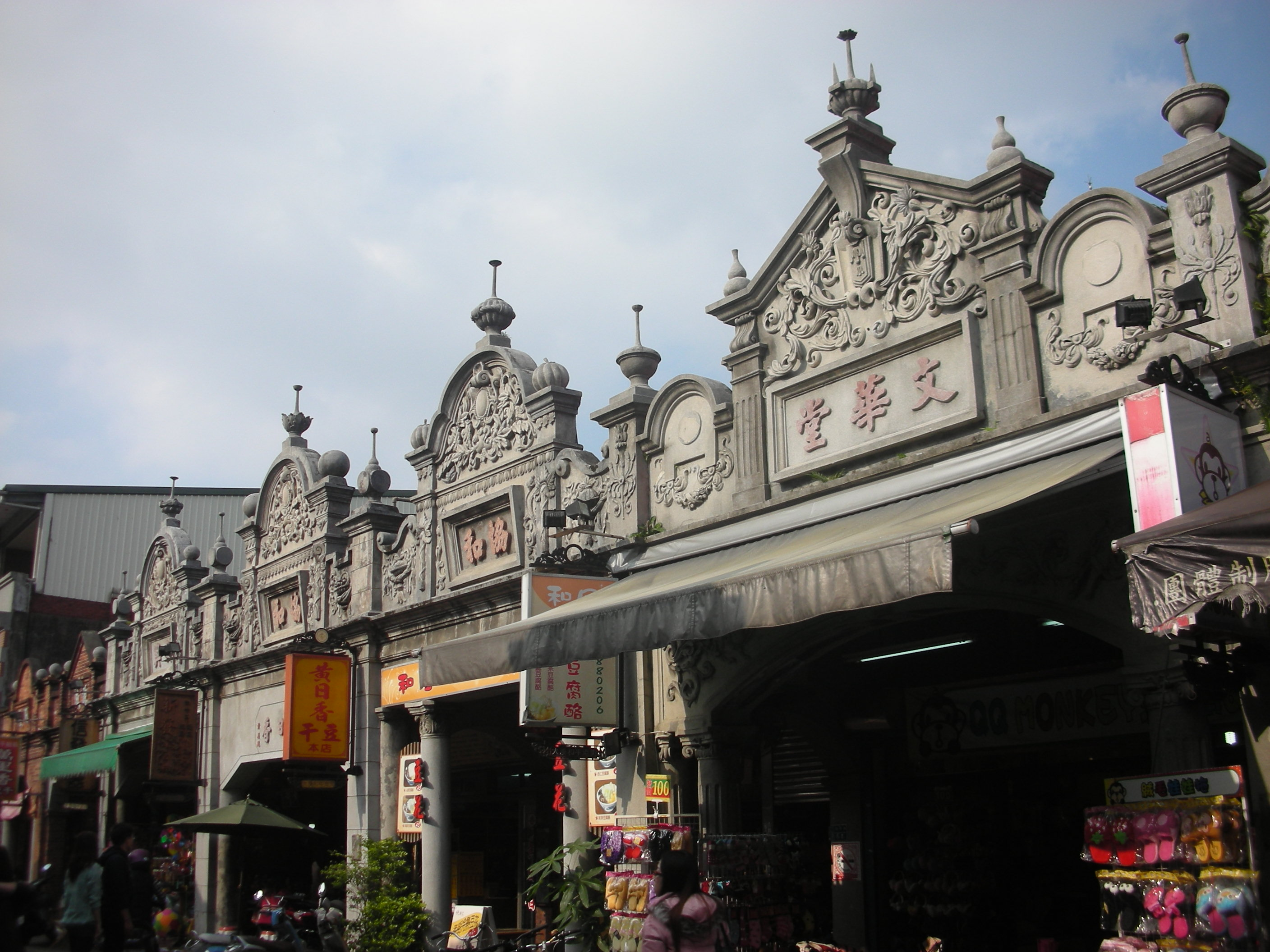
Shophouses in Daxi, Taiwan

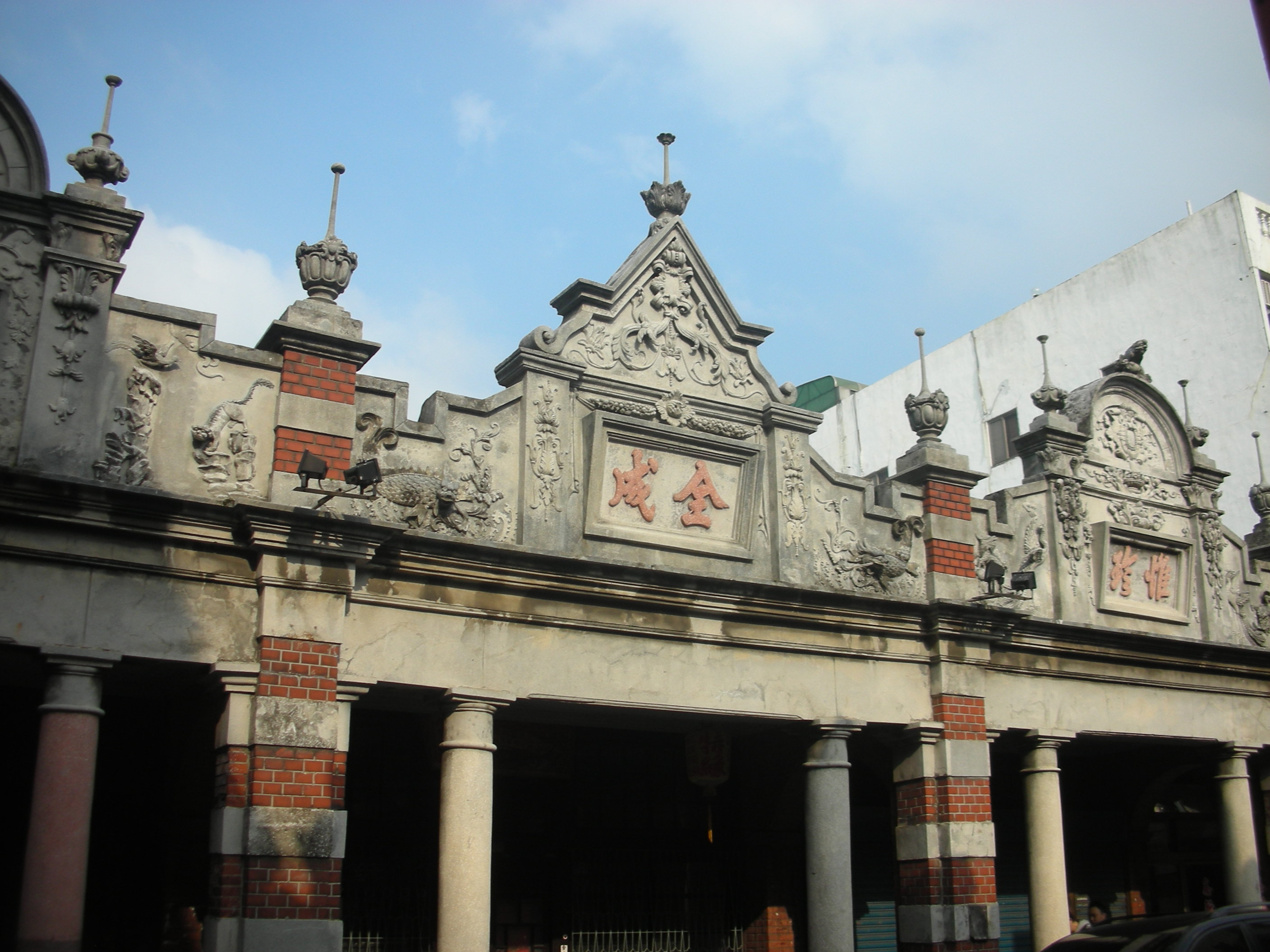
Shophouses in Daxi, Taiwan

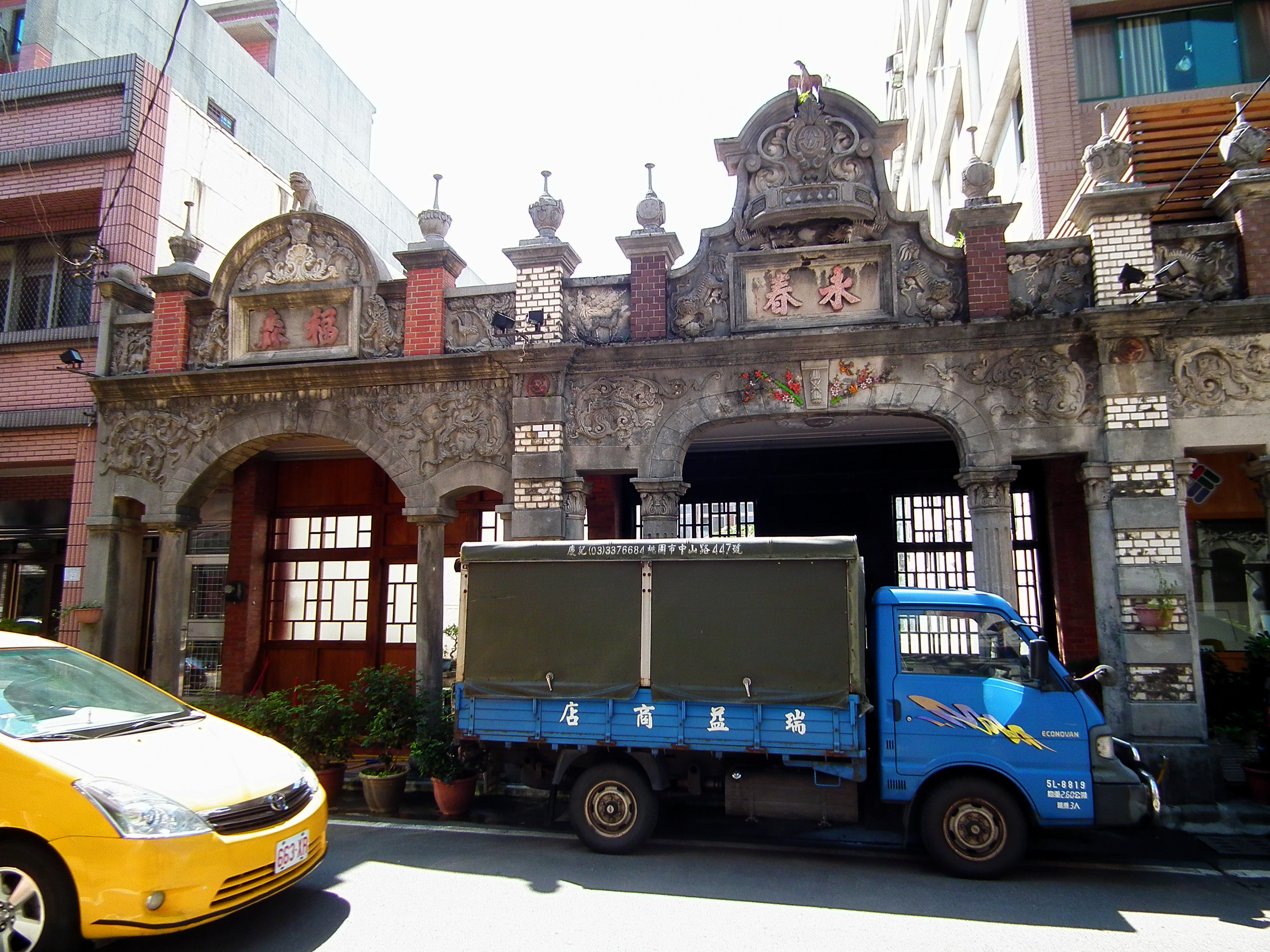
Shophouses in Daxi, Taiwan

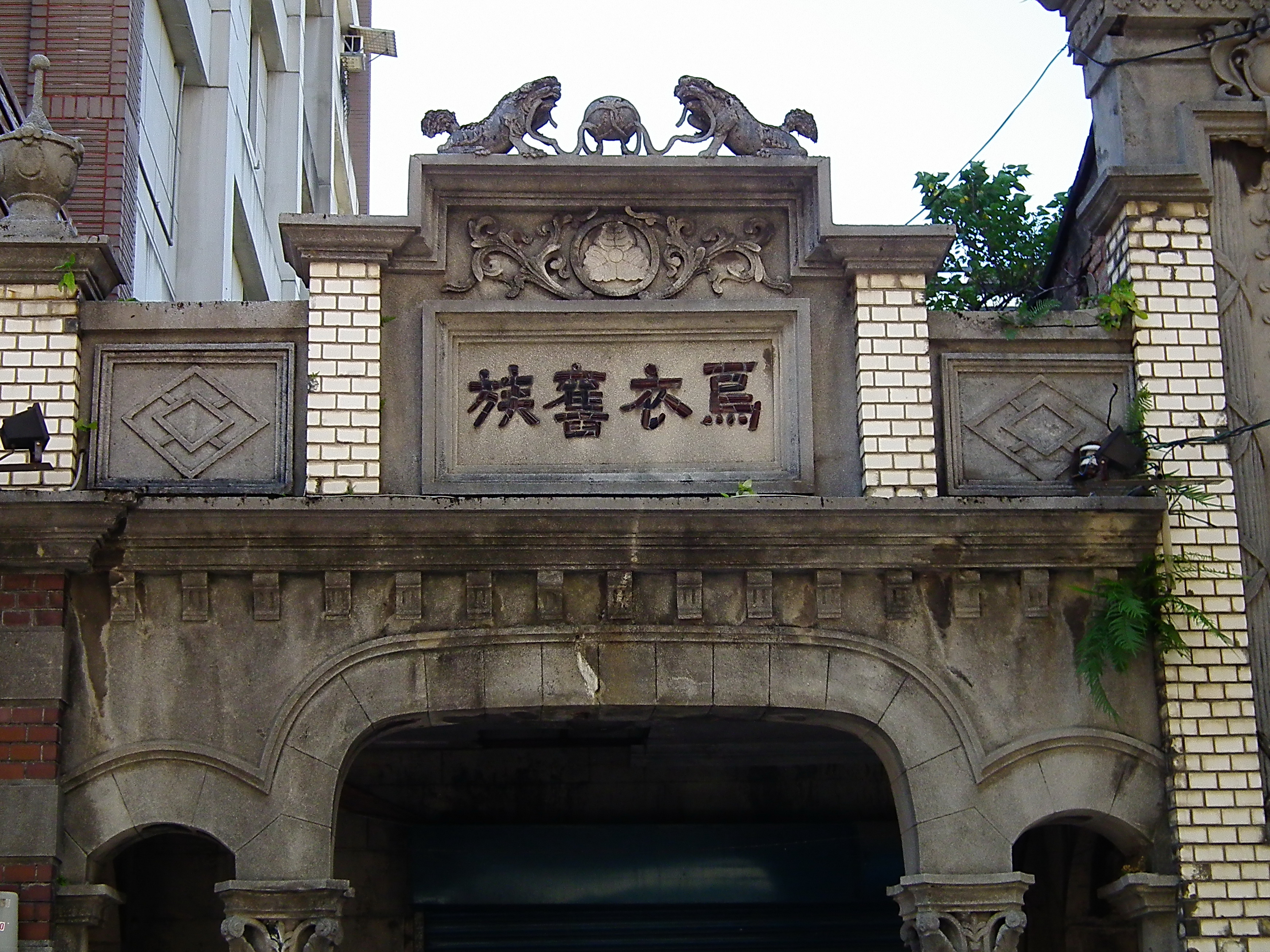
Shophouse in Daxi, Taiwan

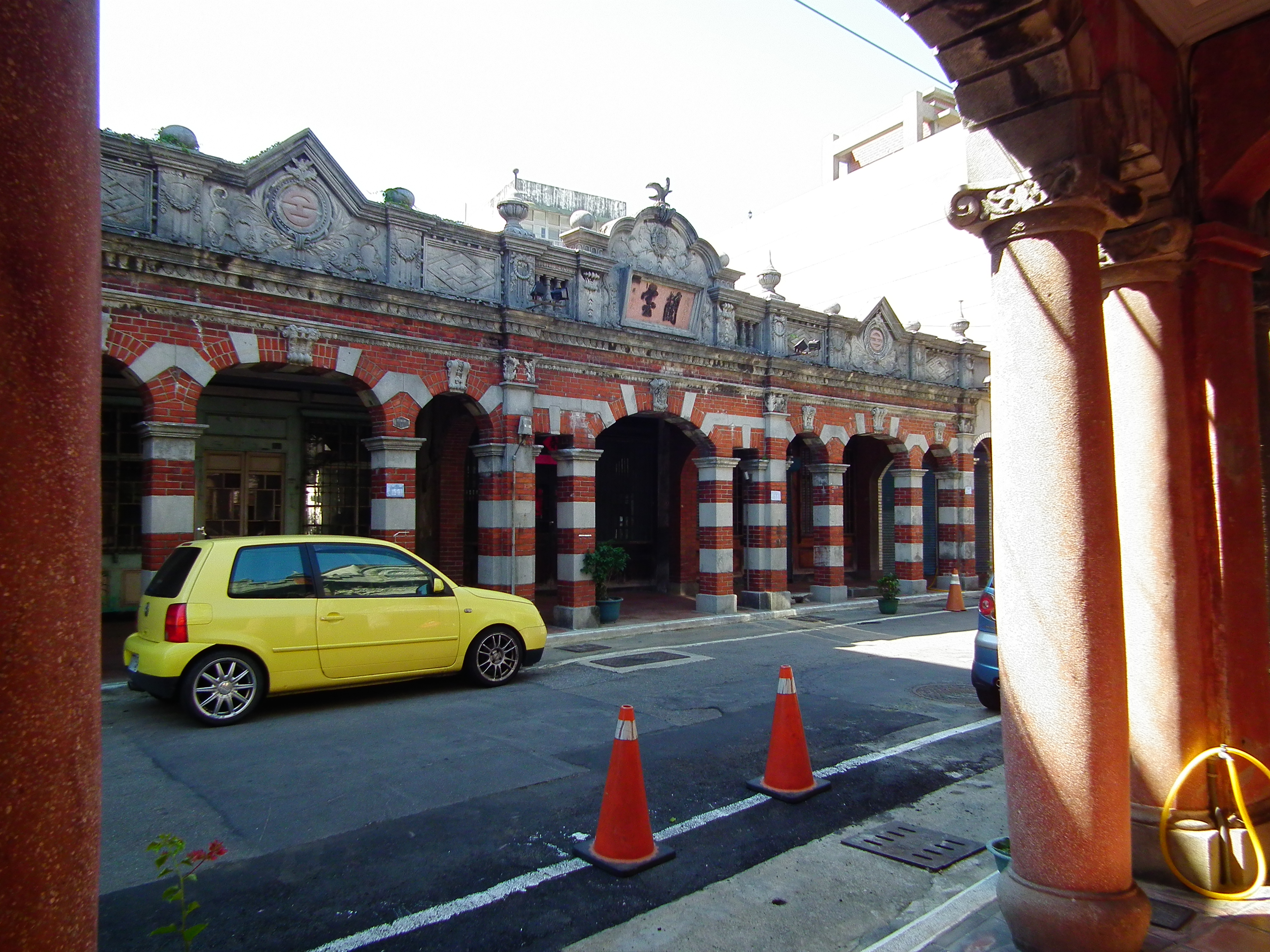
Shophouses in Daxi, Taiwan

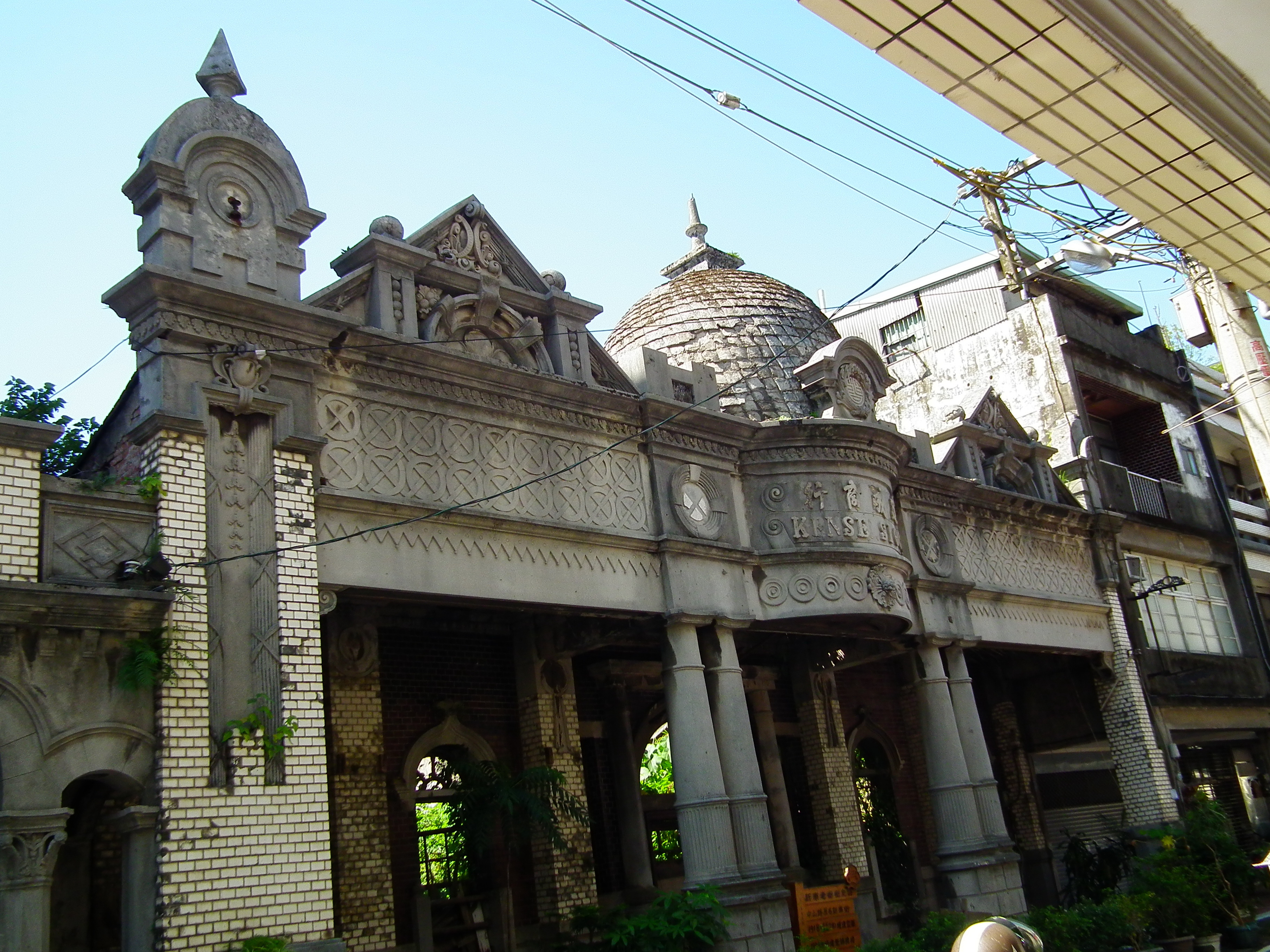
Shophouse in Daxi, Taiwan

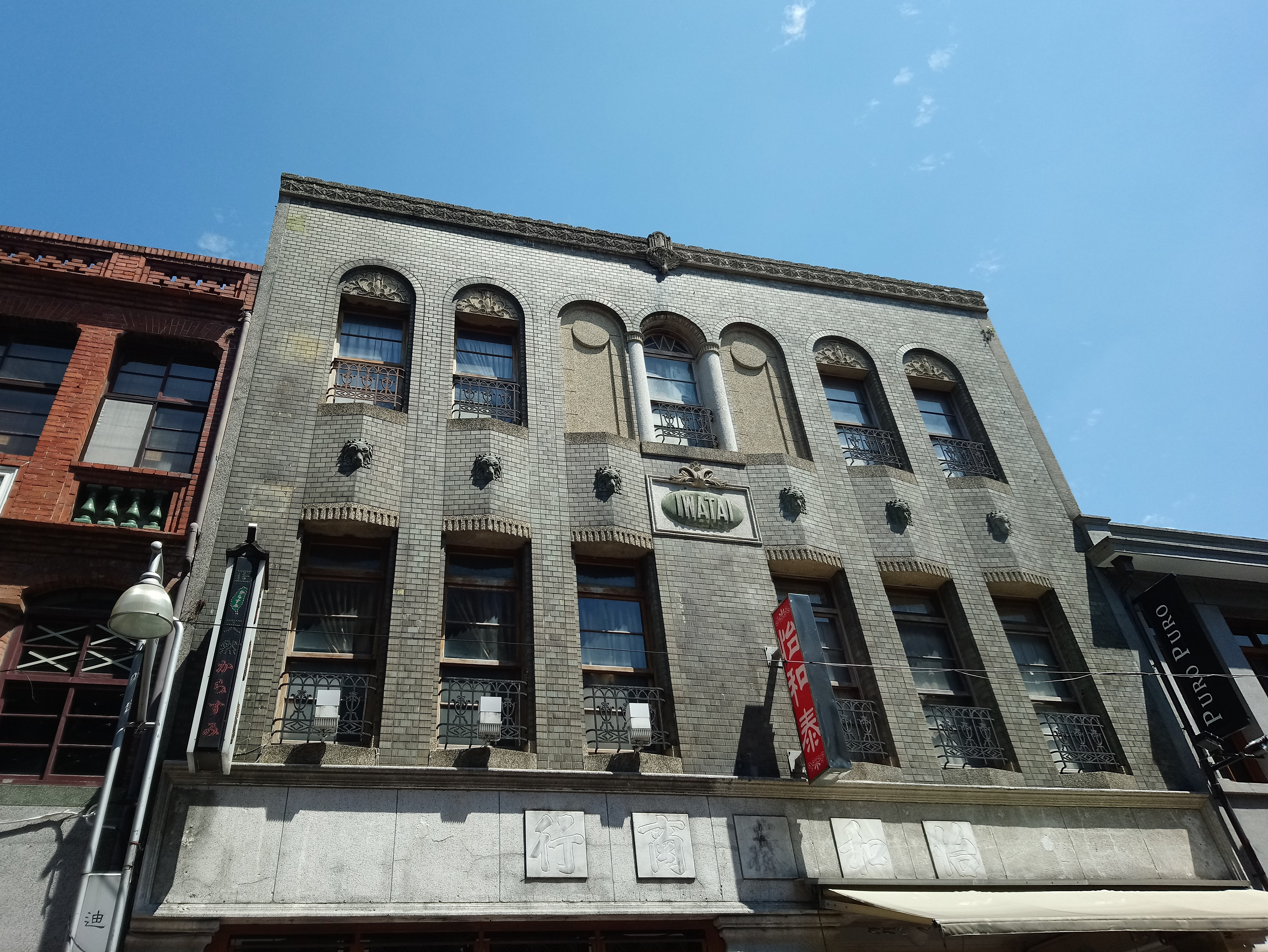
Shophouse in Twatutia, Taiwan

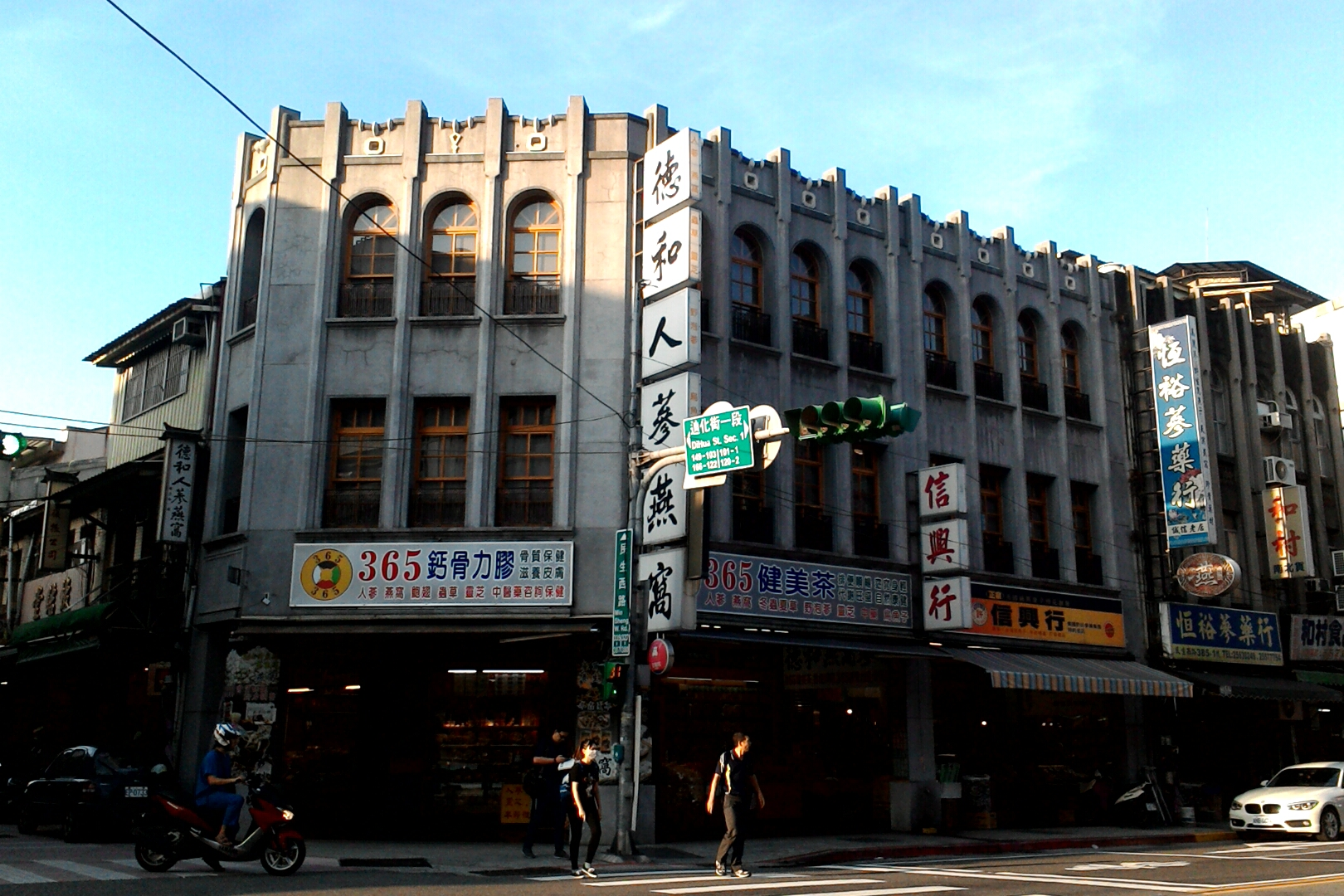
Shophouses in Twatutia, Taiwan

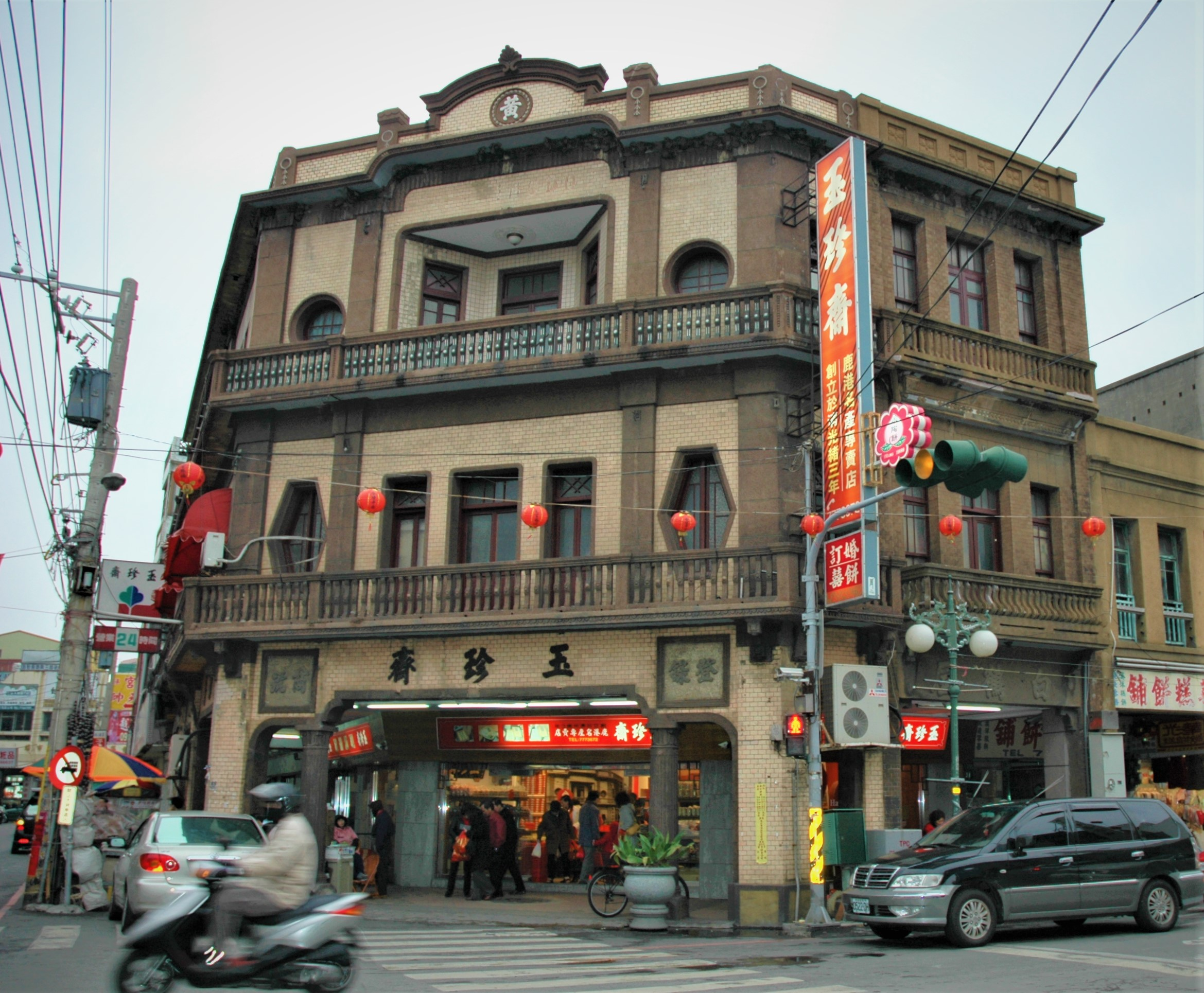
Shophouse in Lukang, Taiwan

=== Function ===
The front of the shop on the ground floor in most cases is used for commercial purposes, while the upper floors are intended for residential use. The ground floor may serve as food and drink shops, offices, shops, or workshops. If the ground floor include living spaces (usually located at the back), it may be used as reception, guestrooms, and formal family rooms with ancestor altars. As the settlement prospered and population increased, some front shops were put to professional uses such as clinics, drugstores, law offices, pawnshops, travel agencies. Food and drink shops usually served economical selections, such as a variety of ready-cooked food of Chinese style, Padang style (Halal), or Siamese style. Cooking stalls rented a portion of space from the shop owner and served specific food such as fried noodles, fried rice, Indian pancakes, noodle soup. A variety of drinks was served by a different stall, sometimes by the shop owner. Such stalls have been replaced by food courts.

Street corners were prized as the best location for food and drink shops.

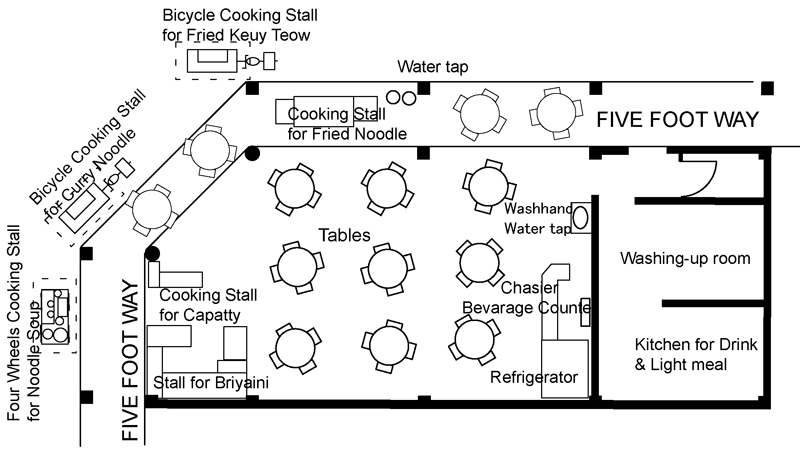
Street corner, Georgetown, Penang, 1990

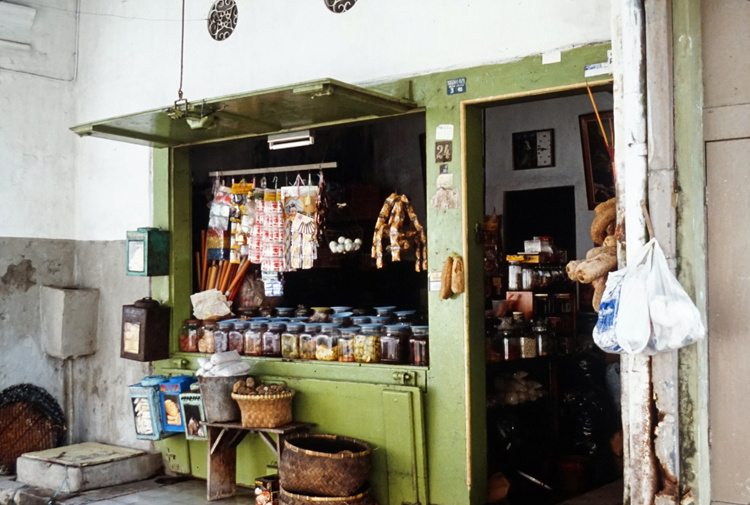
Shophouse, Pecinan, Semarang, 1991

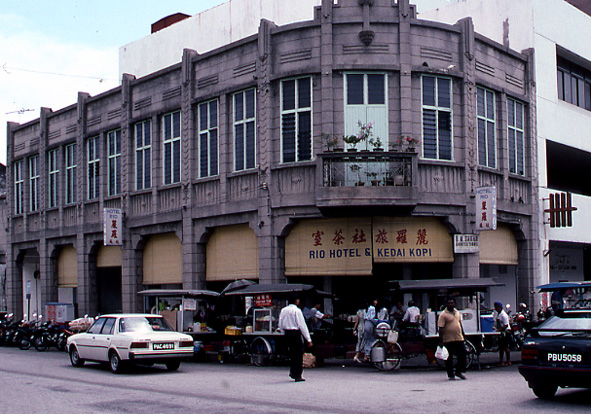
Shophouse, George Town, Malaysia, 1995

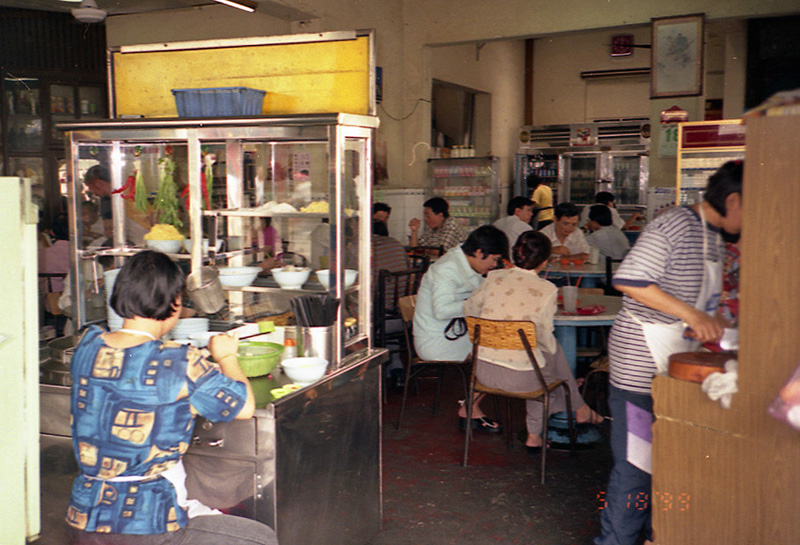
Shophouse at a street corner, George Town, Malaysia, 1999

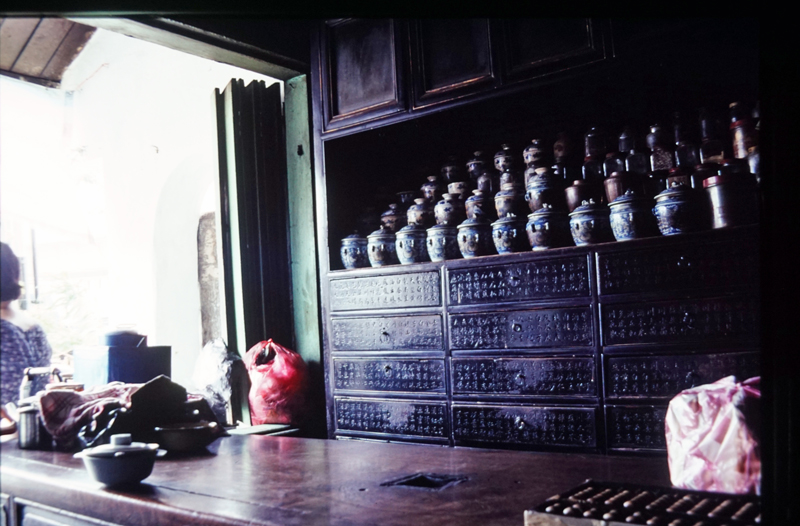
Shophouse pharmacy, Glodok, Jakarta, 1991

== Modern construction ==
Modern shophouses are made of reinforced concrete. Loads are carried by beams and piers, built on a grid system. The spacing of the piers is determined by economic factors: wider beams require larger amounts of steel. A plot of land that measures 40 m wide and 12 m deep, could be used to create 10 shophouses, each measuring 4 m x 12 m, or eight shophouses measuring 5 m x 12 m, or something in between.

Walls are infill, which means that a row of shophouses can easily be reconfigured, to allow a business to occupy two or more shophouses, by simply removing the dividing walls.

A row of shophouses can be built in stages by exposing around 50–60 cm of rebar in the left-right beams at each end of the row. When continuing construction, new rebar is tied to the existing rebar to allow the beam to be continued, thereby removing the need for new structural piers.

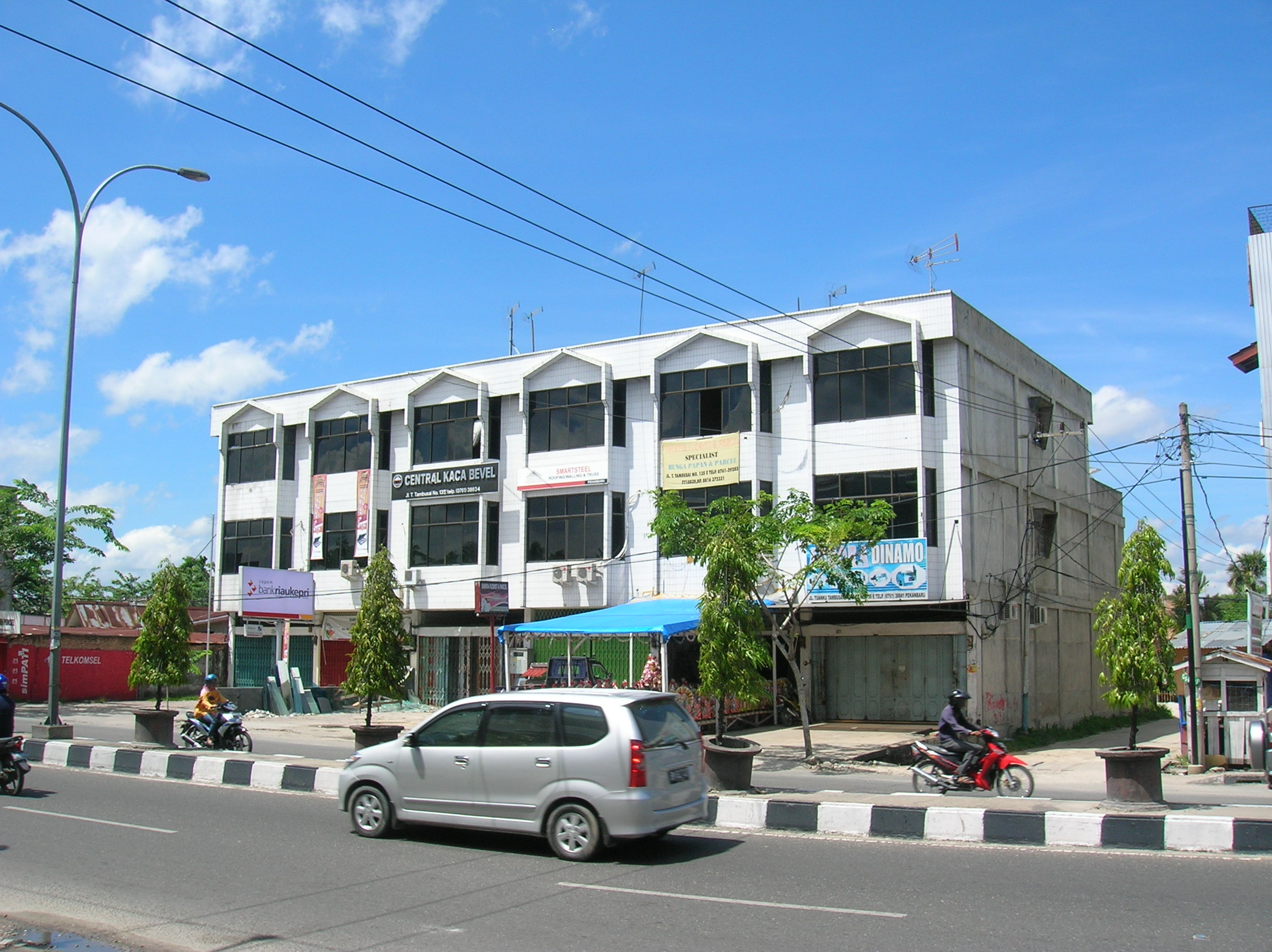
A row of six reinforced concrete shophouses in Pekanbaru, Indonesia

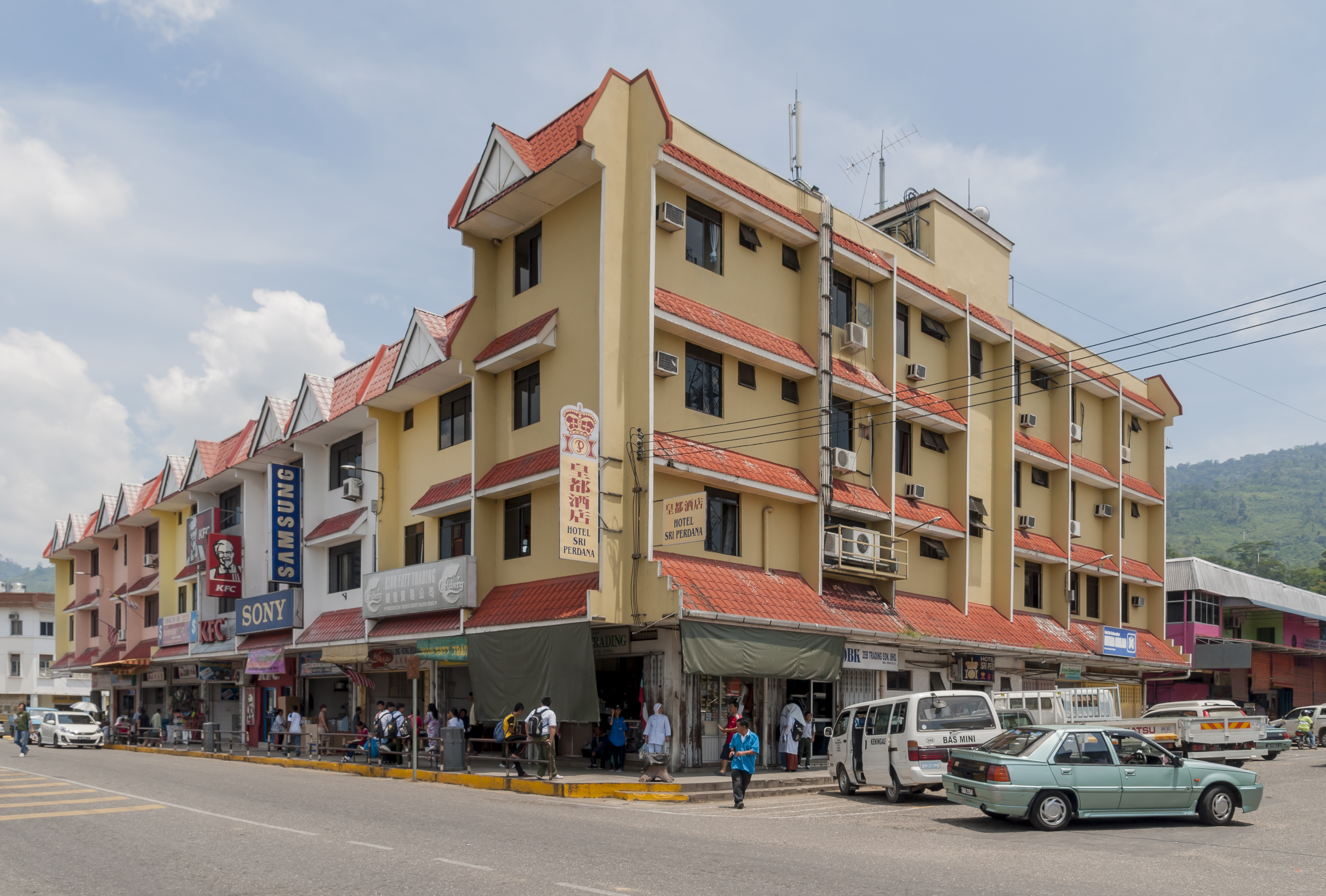
Row of contemporary shophouses in Tenom, Malaysia

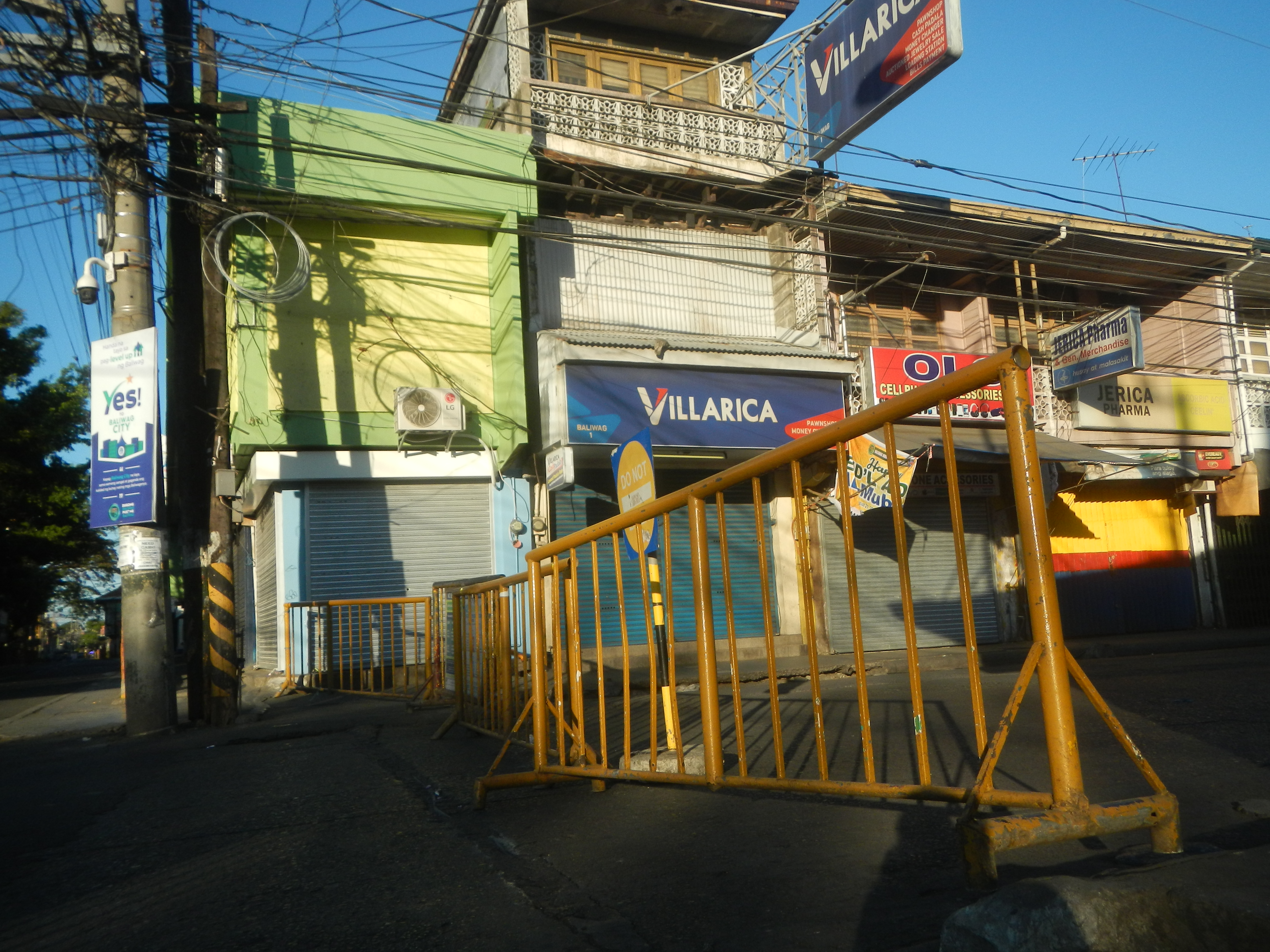
1970s-era shophouses in Baliwag, Philippines

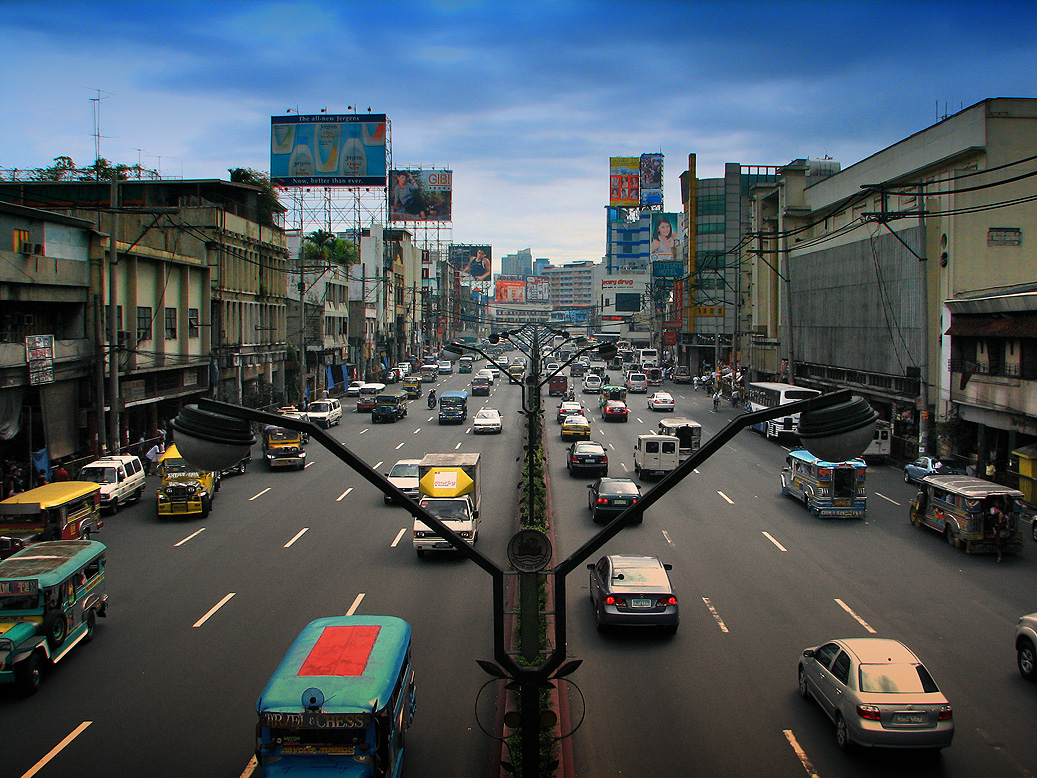
Post-war modernist shophouses in Quiapo, Manila, Philippines

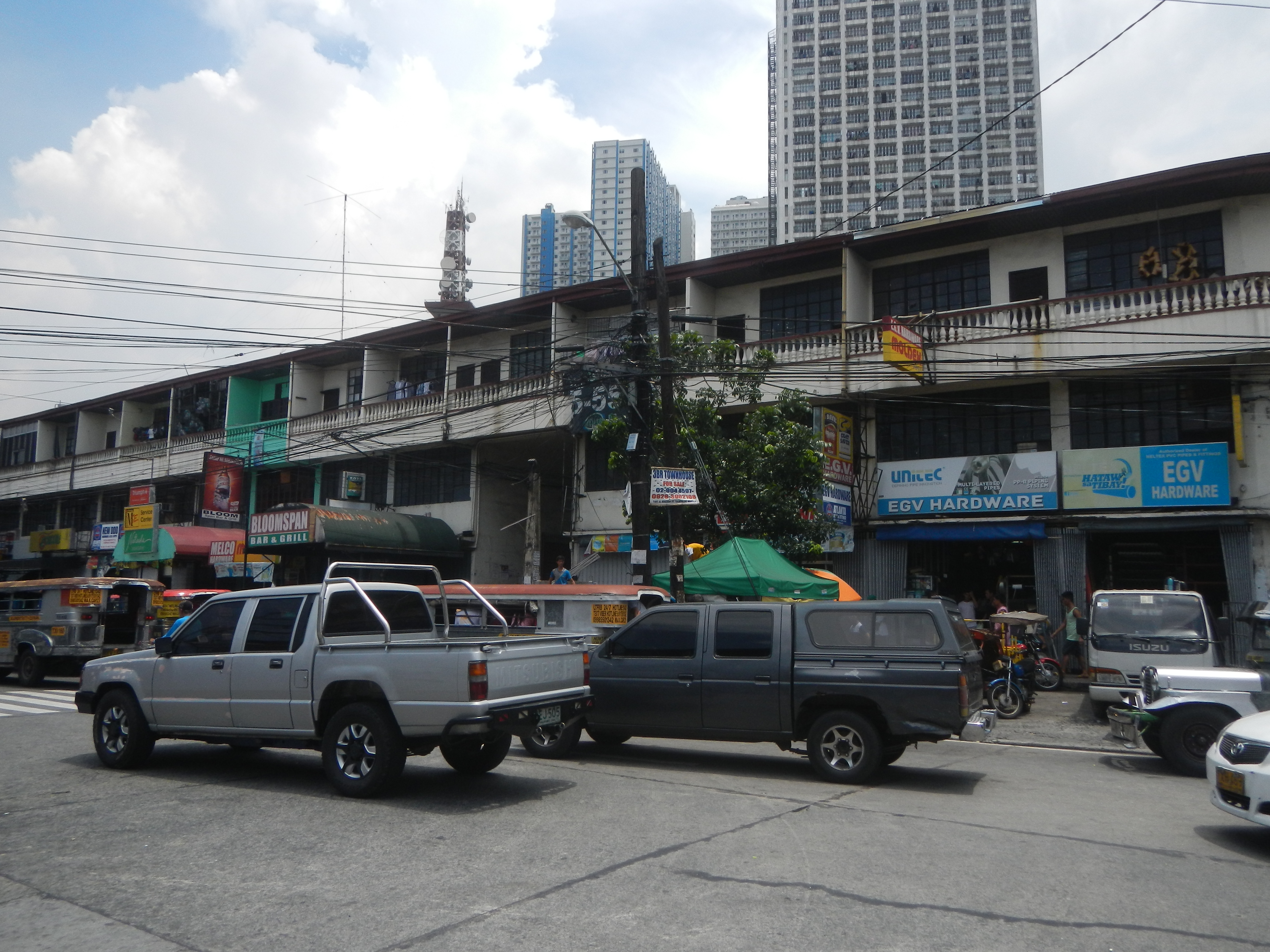
Late 1970s mixed-use tenements in Sampaloc, Manila

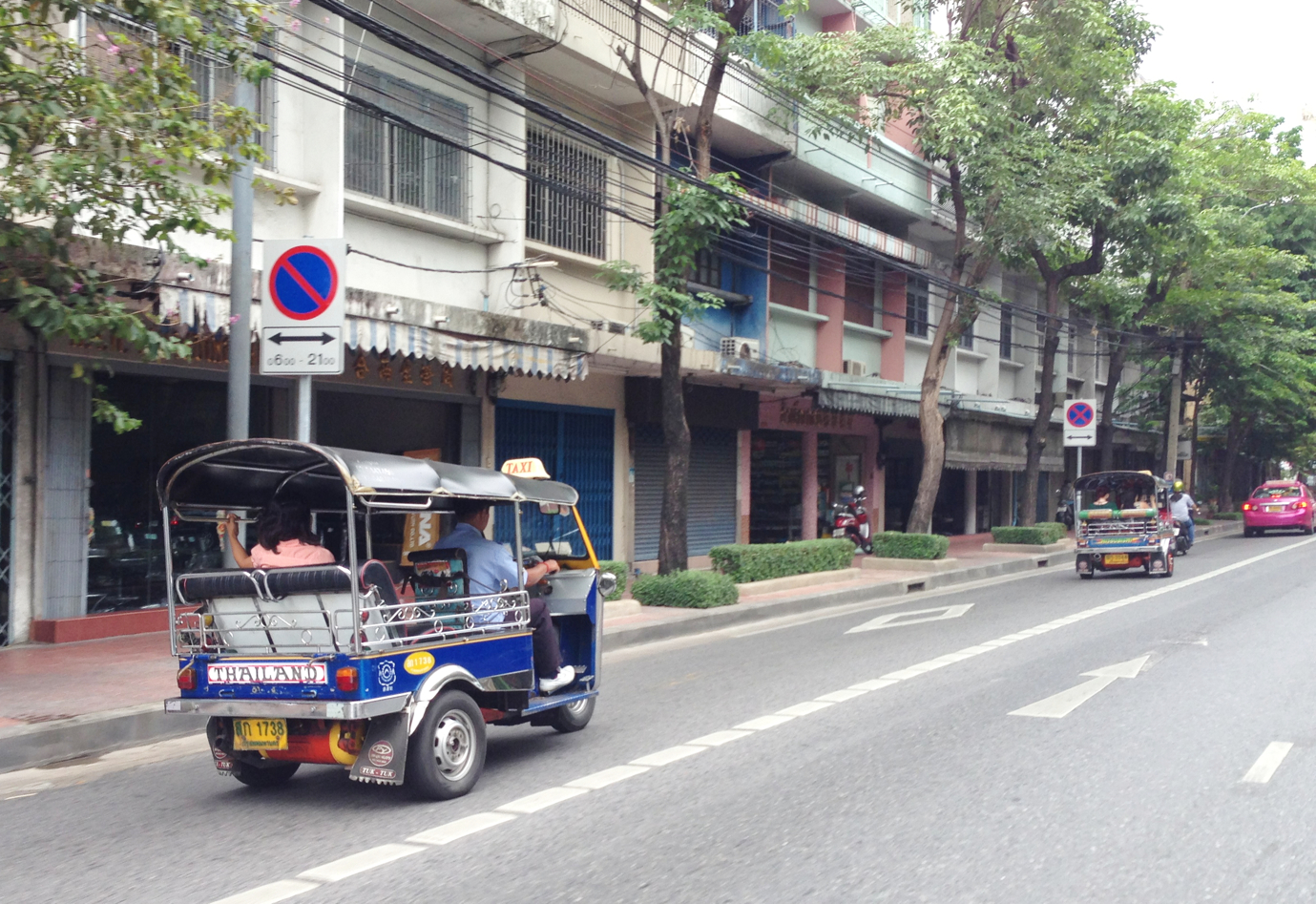
Modernist shophouses in Bangkok, Thailand

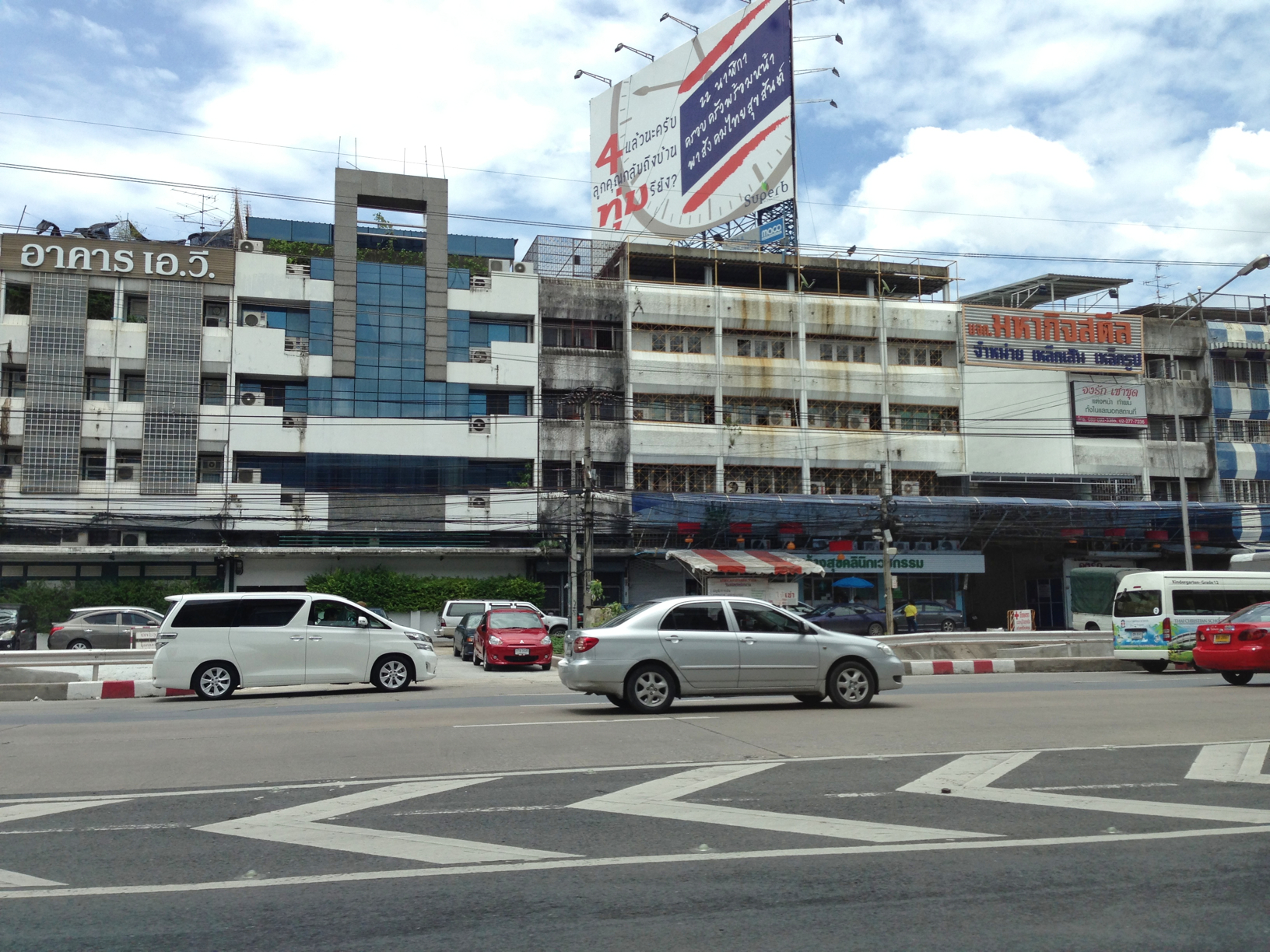
Brutalist shophouses beside a contemporary office block in Chatuchak District, Bangkok

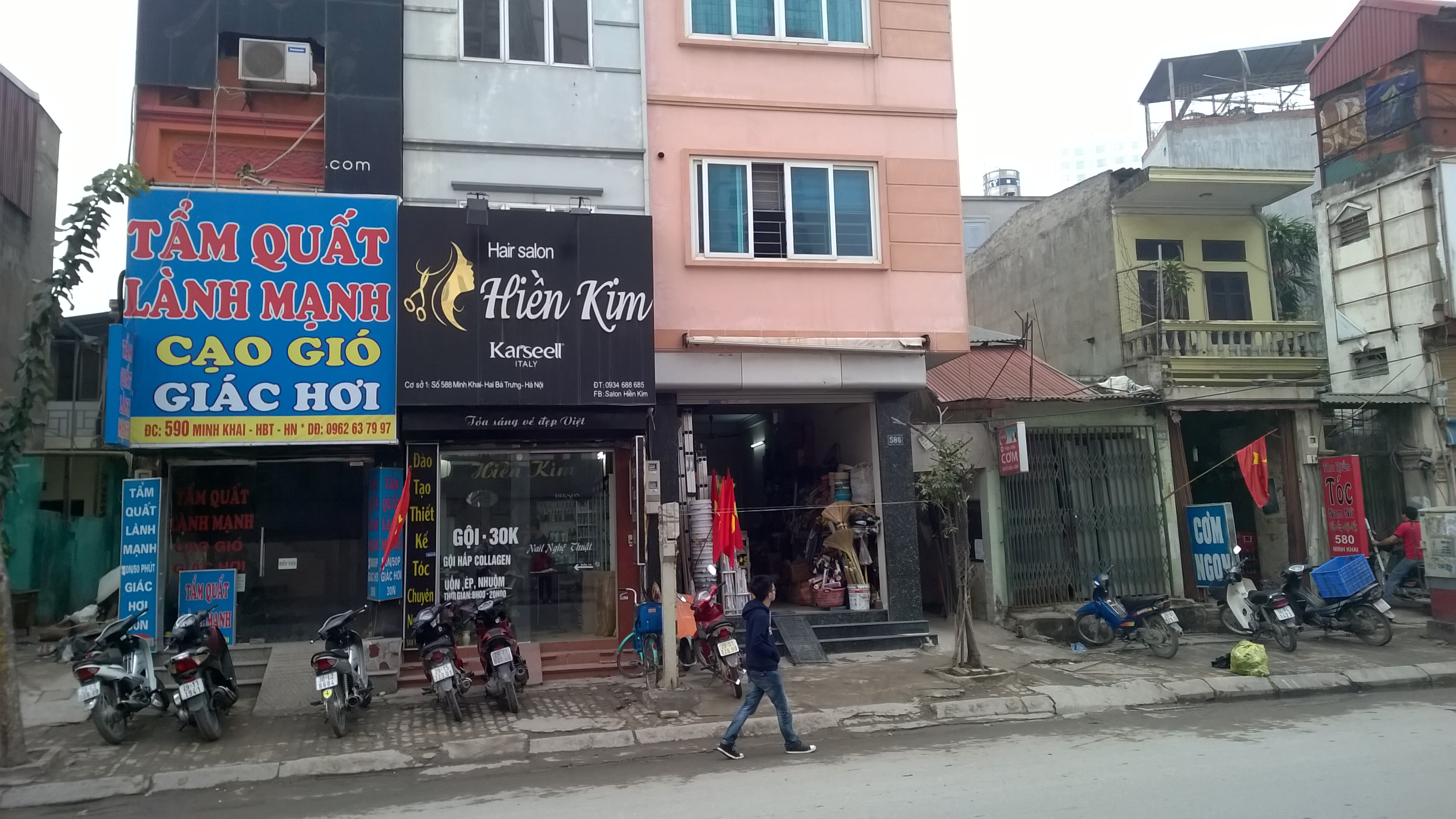
Minh Khai Street, Hanoi, Vietnam

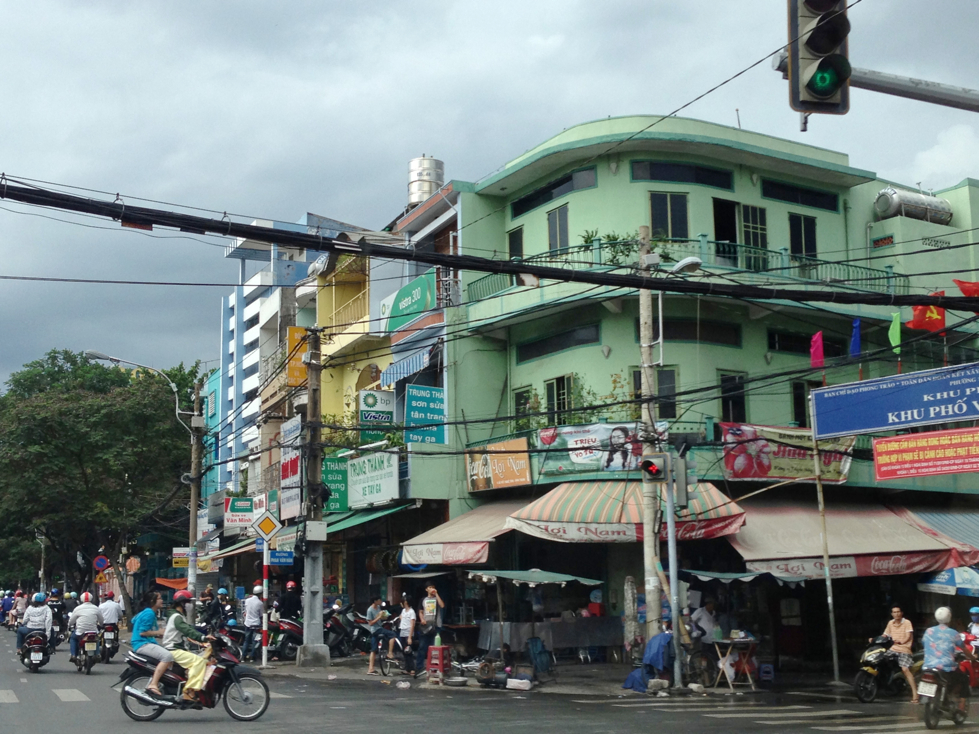
Renovated units in Ho Chi Minh City, Vietnam

== Singapore shophouses ==
The shophouses of Singapore evolved from the early-19th century during the colonial era. It was first introduced by Stamford Raffles who specified in his Town Plan for Singapore the uniformity and regularity of the building, the material used as well as features of the buildings such as a covered passageway. After the colonial era, shophouses became old and dilapidated, leading to a fraction of them abandoned or razed (by demolition work or, on occasion, fire).

In Singapore, the Land Acquisition Act for urban development, passed during the early-1960s and amended in 1973, affected owners of shophouses and worked a significant compensatory unfairness upon them when their shophouses were seized to satisfy redevelopment efforts. Over the decades, entire blocks of historical shophouses in the urban centre were leveled for high-density developments or governmental facilities.

Owners and occupants of colonial shophouses in Malaysia underwent different experiences involving a series of rent control legislation put in place between 1956 and 1966. Under the most recent 1966 Control of Rent Act, privately owned buildings constructed before 1948, including scores of shophouses, were subjected to rent price controls to alleviate housing shortages, with the intent of providing the increasingly urbanised population with sufficient affordable housing. In the decades following the introduction of the act in 1966, development of sites that the shophouses rest on were often unprofitable due to poor rental takings, leading to historical urban districts stagnating but being effectively preserved, although entire blocks of shophouses were known to be demolished for a variety of reasons during the upsurge of the economy (from government acquisitions to destruction from fires). With the repeal of the act in 1997, landowners were eventually granted authority to determine rent levels and be enticed to develop or sell off pre-1948 shophouses; as a result, poorer tenants were priced out and many of the buildings were extensively altered or demolished for redevelopment over the course of the 2000s and 2010s. Shophouses have also been documented to be illegally sealed for use to cultivate and harvest edible bird's nests, leading to long-term internal damage of the buildings.

Many shophouses in Singapore that escaped the effects of the Land Acquisition Act have now undergone a revival of sorts, with some restored and renovated as budget hotels, tea houses, and cinemas. Some shophouses are now considered architectural landmarks and have substantially increased in value. In 2011 in Singapore, two of every three shophouse units sold for between S$1.7–5.5 million (US$1.4–4.4 million), while larger units sold for between S$10–12.5 million (US$8–10 million), a sharp increase from 2010, while average per-square-foot prices increased 21% from 2010. The median price in Singapore in 2011 was 74% higher than in 2007.

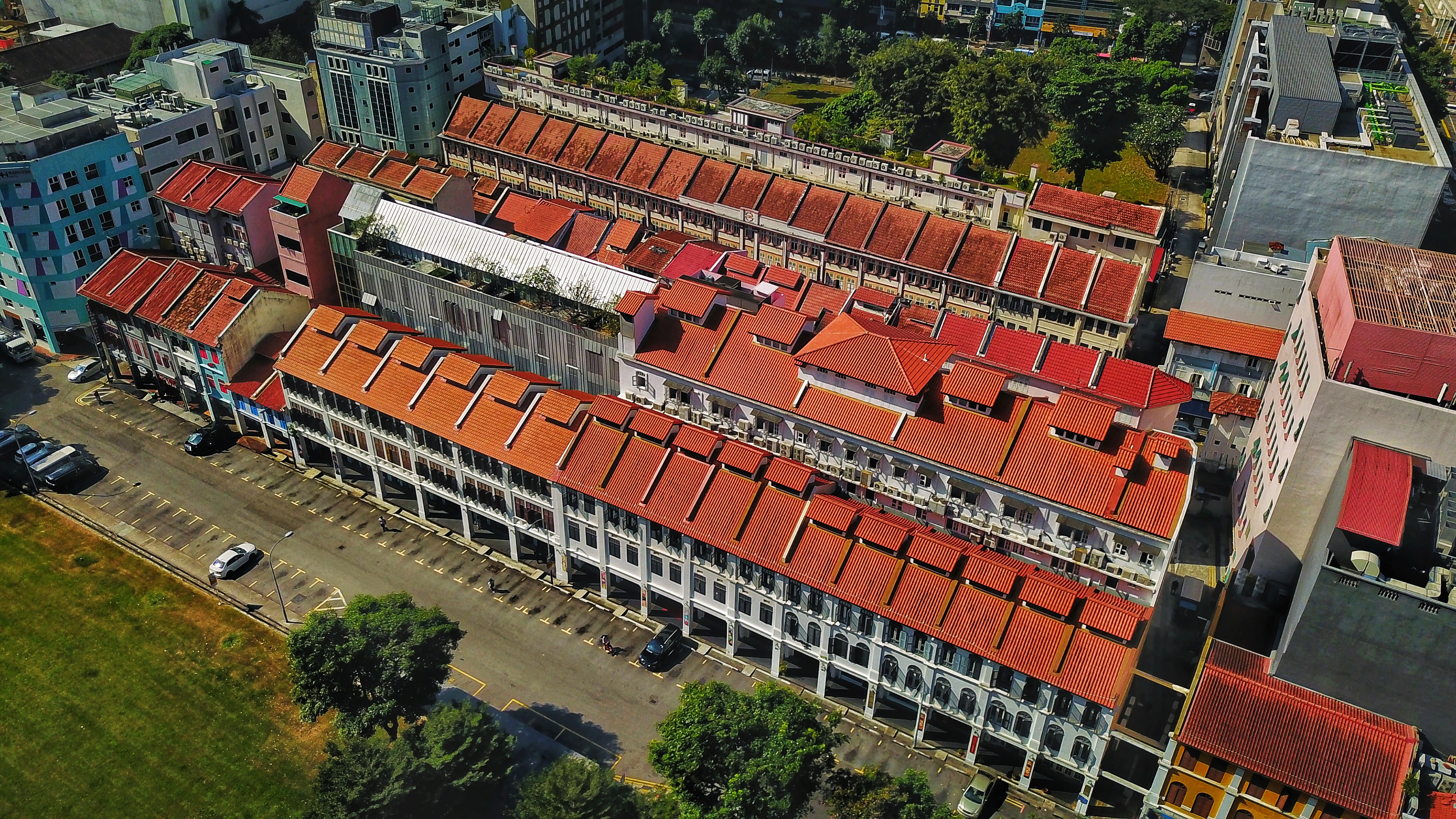
Pre-war shophouses in Bugis's Tan Quee Lan Street

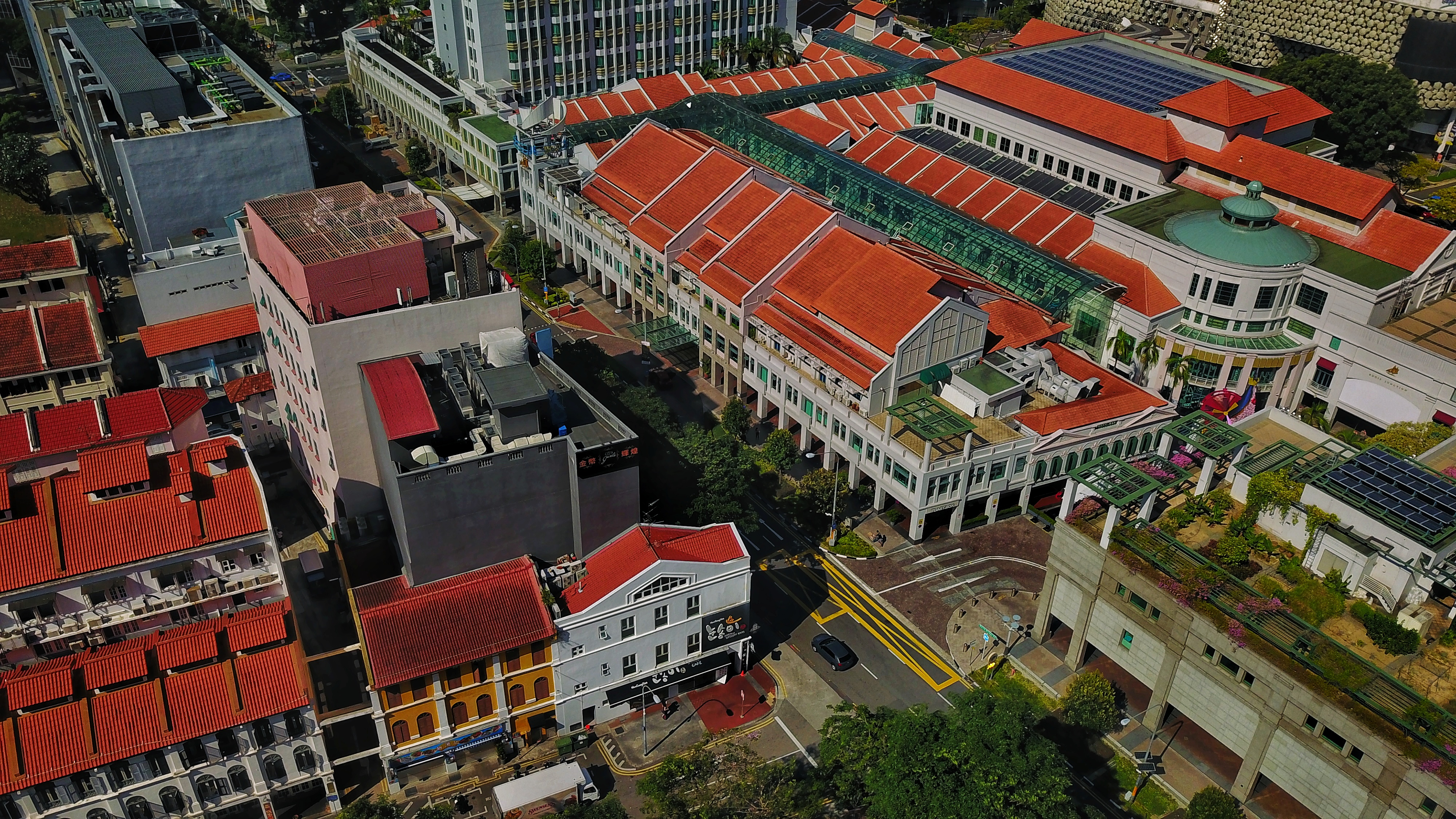
Bugis Junction's glass roof provided for pre-war shophouses. February 2019.

== Heritage shophouses in Malaysia ==
While the preservation of historic shophouses has suffered substantially in heavily developed states like Johor, Kuala Lumpur, Negeri Sembilan, Perak, and Selangor, shophouses in Malacca and Penang (which state capitals, Malacca Town and George Town, have been gazetted as UNESCO World Heritage Sites in 2008) received more care and attention due to emerging historical preservation movements in both states, experiencing similar levels of rejuvenation as in Singapore. However, the gentrification of both cities has led to older tenants of shophouses being driven out by the rising costs of renting or buying properties within historical districts. In 2012, the cost of buying a pre-World War II shophouse in George Town reached RM2,000 per square foot (US$660), equivalent to the price of the most expensive Kuala Lumpur city centre condominium units.

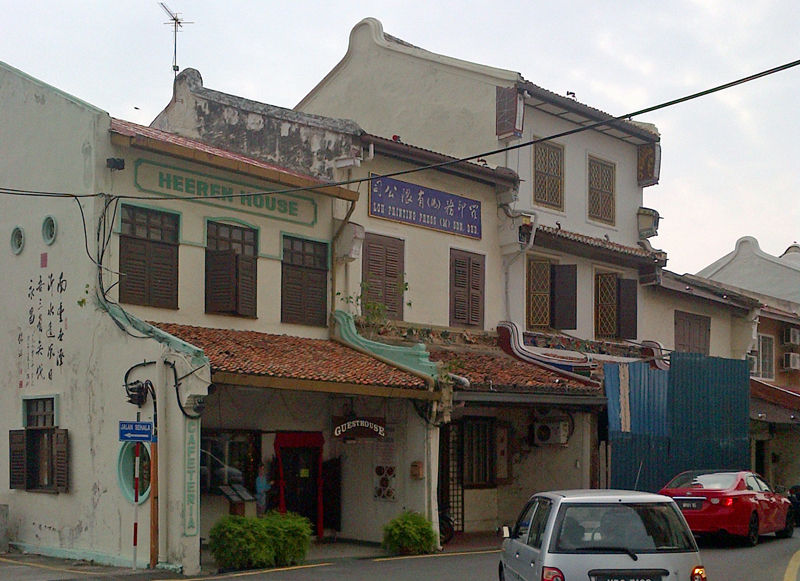
Heritage shophouses in Melaka converted into guesthouse, 2008

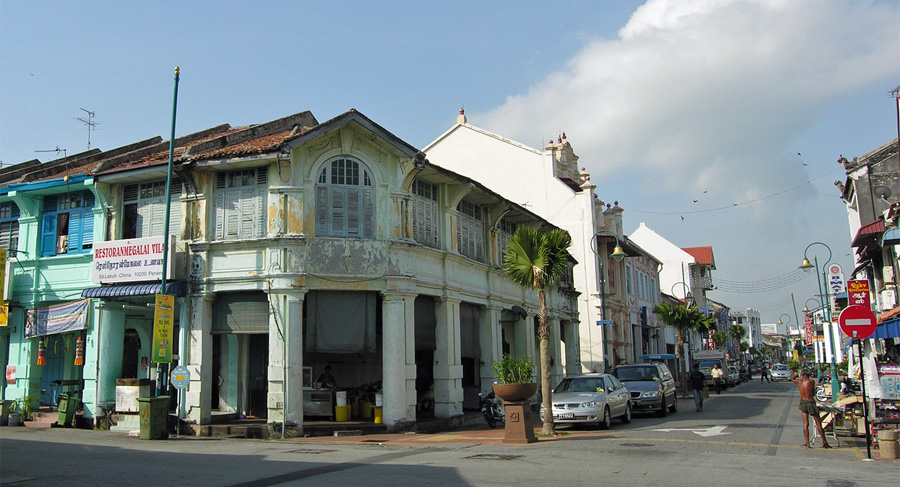
Heritage shophouses, George Town, Penang, 2008

== Indonesian shophouses ==
Shophouses have been very popular since the Dutch colonial period, particularly in pecinan ('Chinese quarter'). Traditional shophouses are now replaced by modern ones, called ruko (rumah toko).

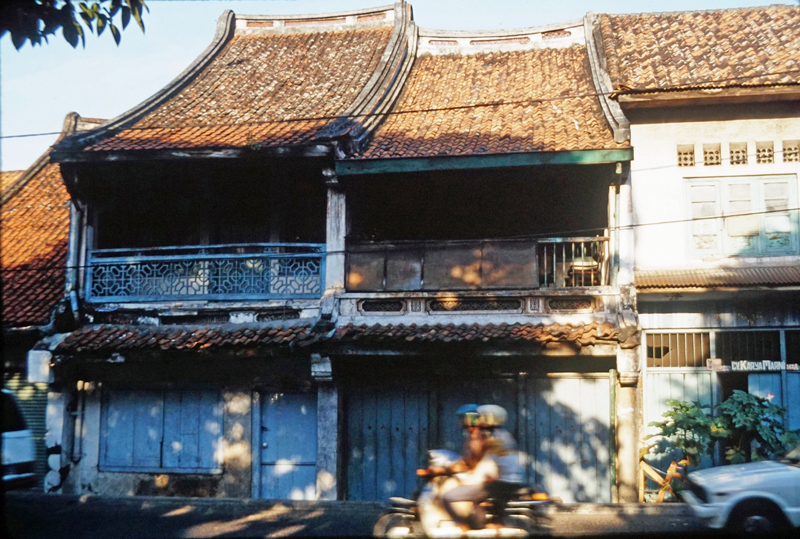
Shophouses along Jalan Kramat Raya, Senen, Jakarta, 1991

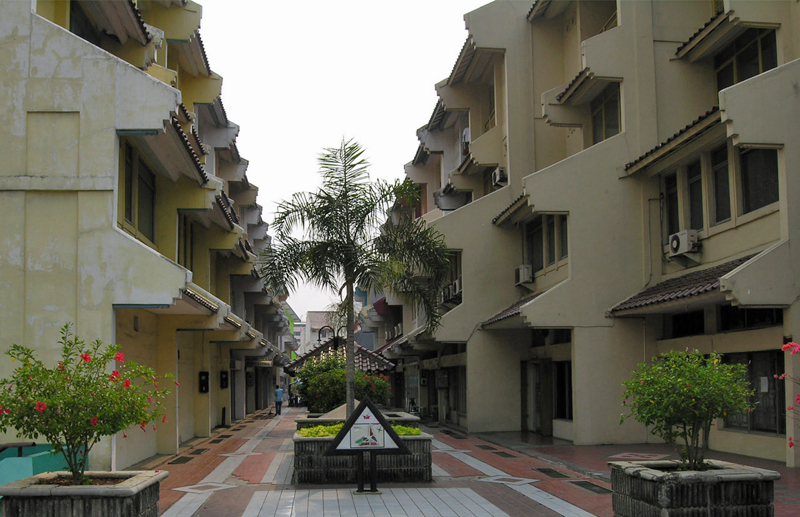
Ruko Development in Senen, Jakarta, 2010

== See also ==
- Ancestral houses of the Philippines
- Architecture of Portugal
- Architecture of Singapore
- Bahay na Bato
- Bruges merchant houses
- Chinese architecture
- Lingnan culture
- Malay houses
- Medieval Merchant's House in Southampton
- Nipa hut
- Rumah adat
- Sino-Portuguese architecture
- Strip mall in North America
- Terraced house
- Tong Lau, in Hong Kong and southern China
