= List of Singaporeans =

This is a list of Singaporeans, people who are identified with Singapore through residential, legal, historical, or cultural means, sorted by surnames/family names.

Please do not add entries that have no articles written about them.

| Name | | Birth | Death | Occupation(s) |
| English · Malay | Chinese · Tamil · Jawi · Other | Birth | Death | Occupation(s) |
|---|---|---|---|---|
| Ang Peng Siong | 洪秉祥 | 27 October 1962 | | Sportsman |
| Jeanette Aw | 欧萱 | 28 June 1979 | | Actress |
| Baey Yam Keng | 马元庆 | 31 August 1970 | | Politician |
| Vivian Balakrishnan | விவியன் பாலகிருஷ்ணன் | 25 January 1961 | | Politician, doctor |
| Taufik Batisah | محمد تيوفيك بن بتيسه | 10 December 1981 | | Singer, actor |
| Daniel Bennett | | 7 January 1978 | | Sportsman |
| Agu Casmir | | 23 March 1984 | | Sportsman |
| Chan Heng Chee | 陈庆珠 | 19 April 1942 | | Diplomat, professor |
| Chan Chun Sing | 陈振声 | 9 October 1969 | | Politician |
| Kit Chan | 陈洁仪 | 15 September 1972 | | Singer, actress |
| Chan Sek Keong | 陈锡强 | 5 November 1937 | | 3rd Chief Justice of Singapore |
| Cheang Hong Lim | 章芳林 | 1825 | 11 February 1893 | Businessman, philanthropist |
| Chew Choon Seng | 周俊成 | 9 October 1969 | | Businessman |
| Chew Shou Zi | 周受资 | 1 January 1983 | | Businessman and CEO of TikTok since 2021 |
| Chia Kiah Hong Steve | 谢镜丰 | | | Politician |
| Archbishop Nicholas Chia | 谢益裕 | 8 April 1938 | | Archbishop of Catholic Church |
| Chia Thye Poh | 谢太宝 | 1941 | | Politician |
| Chiam See Tong | 詹时中 | 12 March 1935 | | Politician, teacher, lawyer |
| Felicia Chin | 陳風玲 | 24 October 1984 | | Actress |
| Annabel Chong | | 22 May 1972 | | Web developer, former pornographic film actress |
| Michelle Chong | 庄米雪 | 22 April 1977 | | Actress |
| Steven Chong | | | | High Court Judge |
| Chua Phung Kim | | 1939 | 1990 | Sportsman |
| Simon Chua | | | | Sportsman |
| Tanya Chua | 蔡健雅 | 28 January 1975 | | Singer |
| S Dhanabalan | சு. தனபாலன் | 8 August 1937 | | Politician, banker |
| Joanna Dong | 董姿彦 | 15 November 1981 | | singer, entertainer |
| Gerard Ee | 余福金 | 1949 | | Lawyer, philanthropist |
| Clement Everitt | | 22 December 1873 | February 1934 | Lawyer, politician |
| Fandi Ahmad | | 29 May 1962 | | Sportsman |
| Fann Wong | 范文芳 | 27 January 1971 | | Actress, singer, model, cartoonist |
| Geh Min | 倪敏 | | | Doctor, politician |
| Goh Chok Tong | 吴作栋 | 20 May 1941 | | Politician, 2nd Prime Minister of Singapore |
| Keith Goh | | | | Doctor |
| Goh Keng Swee | 吴庆瑞 | 6 October 1918 | 14 May 2010 | Politician |
| Goh Tat Chuan | | | | Sportsman |
| Rohan Gunaratna | | | | Political analyst, writer |
| Han Sai Por | 韩少芙 | 19 July 1943 | | Sculptor |
| Abdul Halim bin Haron | | | | Sportsman |
| Hazlina Halim | | 17 February 1985 | | Presenter/journalist |
| Mavis Hee | 许美静 | 27 September 1974 | | Singer |
| Ivan Heng | | 1963 | | Actor, director |
| Heng Swee Keat | 王瑞杰 | 1961 | | Politician |
| Ho Ching | 何晶 | | | Businesswoman |
| Christian Ho | 何宗宪 | 31 October 2006 | | Racing driver |
| Ho Yuen Hoe | 淨潤法師 | 18 February 1908 | 11 January 2006 | Buddhist abbess, philanthropist |
| Hoi Kim Heng | | 1970 | 21 May 1994 | Police officer |
| Hon Sui Sen | 韩瑞生 | 1916 | 14 October 1983 | Politician, economist |
| Hong Choon | 宏船法師 | 1907 | 25 December 1990 | Buddhist abbot, President of SBF |
| Indranee Rajah | இந்திராணி இராஜா | 12 April 1963 | | Lawyer, politician |
| Yusof bin Ishak | يوسف بن اسحاق · 尤索夫·伊萨 | 12 August 1910 | 23 November 1970 | Journalist, politician, 1st President of Singapore |
| Shunmugam Jayakumar | சண்முகம் ஜெயக்குமார் | 12 August 1939 | | Lawyer |
| Jiang Yanmei | 江彦媚 | 26 February 1981 | | Sportswoman |
| Jing Jun Hong | 井浚泓 | | | Sportswoman |
| Joshua Benjamin Jeyaretnam | யோசுவா பெஞ்சமின் ஜெயரட்னம் | 1926 | 30 September 2008 | Politician, lawyer |
| Philip Jeyaretnam | பிலிப் ஜெயரட்னம் | 1964 | | Politician, lawyer, writer |
| Kam Ning | | 10 January 1975 | | Violinist |
| Khaw Boon Wan | 许文远 | 8 December 1952 | | Politician |
| Khoo Boon Hui | 邱文晖 | | | Police officer |
| Khoo Teck Puat | 邱德拔 | 13 January 1917 | 21 February 2004 | Businessman |
| Kwa Geok Choo | 柯玉芝 | 21 December 1920 | 2 October 2010 | Lawyer |
| Kwek Leng Beng | 郭令明 | | | Businessman |
| Desmond Kuek Bak Chye | 郭木财 | 28 August 1963 | | Chief executive officer of SMRT Corporation |
| Aaron Lee | | 1972 | | Writer |
| Lee Boon Yang | 李文献 | 1 October 1947 | | Veterinarian, politician |
| Lee Choon Seng | 李俊承 | 1888 | 5 June 1966 | Businessman, philanthropist |
| Dick Lee | 李炳文 | 24 August 1956 | | Singer, composer |
| Lee Hsien Loong | 李显龙 | 10 February 1952 | | Politician, 3rd Prime Minister of Singapore |
| Lee Hsien Yang | 李显扬 | | | Businessman |
| Lee Huei Min | | | | Violinist |
| Lee Kim Lai | | 1960 | 25 April 1978 | Police officer |
| Lee Kong Chian | 李光前 | 18 October 1893 | 2 June 1967 | Businessman, philanthropist |
| Lee Kuan Yew | 李光耀 | 16 September 1923 | 23 March 2015 | Politician, lawyer, 1st Prime Minister of Singapore |
| Maia Lee | 李芝瑛 | 31 January 1983 | | Singer, composer, lyricist, writer, actress |
| Russell Lee | | | | Writer |
| Lee Seng Wee | 李成伟 | | | Businessman, philanthropist |
| Lee Siew Choh | 李绍祖 | 1917 | 18 July 2002 | Politician |
| Li Jiawei | 李佳薇 | 9 August 1981 | | Sportswoman |
| Li Li | 李丽 | 7 July 1983 | | Sportswoman |
| Lien Ying Chow | 連瀛洲 | 2 August 1906 | 6 August 2004 | Businessman |
| Lim Bo Seng | 林谋盛 | 27 April 1909 | 29 June 1944 | Businessman, Freedom fighter |
| Lim Boon Heng | 林文兴 | 18 November 1947 | | Politician |
| Lim Boon Keng | 林文慶 | 1869 | 1957 | Physician, educator, Justice of Peace |
| Catherine Lim | 林宝音 | 1942 | | Writer |
| Ken Lim | | 1964 | | Album producer, composer, publisher, artist manager, concert promoter |
| Lim Hng Kiang | 林勋强 | 9 April 1954 | | Politician |
| Lim Hock Siew | 林福寿 | 21 February 1931 | 4 June 2012 | Doctor, ISA detainee |
| Lim Kim San | 林金山 | 30 November 1916 | 20 July 2006 | Politician |
| Lim Nee Soon | 林義順 | 12 November 1879 | 20 March 1936 | Businessman, banker, clan leader, Justice of Peace |
| Lim Swee Say | 林瑞生 | 13 July 1954 | | Politician |
| Lim Yew Hock | 林有福 | 1914 | 1984 | Politician |
| Rebecca Lim | 林慧玲 | 26 September 1986 | | Actress |
| Su-Chen Christine Lim | | 1948 | | Writer |
| Lin Junjie | 林俊杰 | 27 March 1981 | | Singer, composer |
| Ling How Doong | 林孝谆 | 1934 | 2021 | Politician |
| Lionel Lewis | | | | Police officer, Sportsman |
| Long Gen | 隆根法師 | 1921 | 15 June 2011 | Buddhist abbot, President of SBF |
| Susan Long | | | | Journalist |
| Low Thia Khiang | 刘程强 | | | Politician |
| Olivia Lum | 林爱莲 | | | Businesswoman |
| Shamsul Maidin | | 16 April 1966 | | Football referee |
| Corrinne May | 符美芸 | 19 May | | Singer, composer |
| David Saul Marshall | 大卫·马绍尔 | 12 March 1908 | 12 December 1995 | Politician, lawyer, 1st Chief Minister of Singapore |
| Jeremy Monteiro | | 20 June 1960 | | Singer, pianist |
| Devan Nair | 蒂凡那 | 5 August 1923 | 7 December 2005 | Trade unionist, 3rd President of Singapore |
| Jack Neo | 梁智强 | 24 January 1960 | | Actor, film director, film producer |
| Ng Ser Miang | 黄思绵 | 6 April 1949 | | Diplomat, businessman, Sportsman |
| Dr Ng Eng Hen | 黄永宏, | | | Politician |
| Ng Teng Fong | 黄廷芳 | | | Businessman |
| Eunice Olsen | | | | Politician |
| Ong Keng Yong | | | | Diplomat |
| Remy Ong | | | | Sportsman |
| Ong Teng Cheong | 王鼎昌 | 22 January 1936 | 8 February 2002 | Architect, politician, 5th President of Singapore |
| Adrian Pang | 彭耀顺 | 8 January 1966 | | Actor |
| Poh Seng Song | | 30 January 1983 | | Sportsman |
| V. K. Rajah | | c. 1957 | | Supreme Court Judge |
| Sinnathamby Rajaratnam | சின்னத்தம்பி ராஜரட்ணம் | 25 February 1915 | 22 February 2006 | Politician |
| Sellapan Ramanathan | செல்லப்பன் ராமநாதன் | 3 July 1924 | 22 August 2016 | Politician |
| Adnan Bin Saidi | | 1915 | 14 February 1942 | Soldier |
| Seah Eu Chin | 佘有進 | 30 August 1805 | 23 September 1883 | Businessman, clan leader |
| Tharman Shanmugaratnam | தர்மன் சண்முகரத்தினம் | 25 February 1957 | | Politician, 9th President of Singapore |
| Benjamin Henry Sheares | 本杰明·亨利·薛尔思 | 12 August 1907 | 12 May 1981 | Doctor, politician, 2nd President of Singapore |
| Sylvester Sim | 沈祥龙 | 19 January 1983 | | Singer |
| Davinder Singh | ਦਵਿੰਦਰ ਸਿੰਘ ਸਚਦੇਵ | 1 August 1957 | | Lawyer |
| Gurmit Singh | ਗੁਰਮੀਤ ਓਤ੍ਤਵਨ ਸਿੰਘ · 葛米•星 | 24 March 1965 | | Actor |
| Siow Lee Chin | | | | Violinist, professor |
| Rajesh Sreenivasan | ராஜேஷ் ஸ்ரீனிவாசன் | | 23 November 1969 | Lawyer |
| Stefanie Sun | 孫燕姿 | 23 July 1978 | | Singer |
| Ronald Susilo | | 6 June 1979 | | Sportsman |
| Tan Cheng Bock | 陈清木 | 26 April 1940 | | Presidential candidate |
| Tan Chong Tee | | 1918 | 1942 | War veteran |
| Tan Howe Liang | 陈浩亮 | 1933 | | Sportsman |
| Tan Jee Say | 陈如斯 | 12 February 1954 | | Presidential candidate |
| Tan Kah Kee | 陈嘉庚 | 21 October 1874 | 12 August 1961 | Clan leader, businessman, philanthropist |
| Tan Keng Yam Tony | 陈庆炎 | 7 February 1940 | | Politician, 7th President of Singapore |
| Tan Kim Ching | 陳金鐘 | 1829 | February 1892 | Businessman, politician, Kapitan China of Singapore |
| Tan Kin Lian | 陈钦亮 | 9 March 1948 | | Presidential candidate |
| Tan Lark Sye | 陈六使 | 1897 | 11 September 1975 | Businessman, philanthropist |
| Tan Ser Cher | | 1933 | | Sportsman |
| Sumiko Tan | 苏媚多模摊 | 15 August 1957 | | Journalist |
| Tan Swie Hian | 陈瑞献 | 1943 | | Artist, calligrapher, poet, translator |
| Tan Tock Seng | 陈笃生 | 1798 | 24 February 1850 | Clan leader, businessman, philanthropist |
| Kelvin Tan Wei Lian | 陈伟联 | 5 October 1981 | | Singer, musician, motivational speaker |
| Abdullah Tarmugi | | 25 August 1944 | | Former politician |
| Teo Chee Hean | 张志贤 | 27 December 1954 | | Politician, soldier |
| Thum Ping Tjin | | 17 December 1979 | | Sportsman |
| Tin Pei Ling | 陈佩玲 | 8 July 1983 | | Politician |
| Toh Aik Choon | 杜億春 | 26 July 1927 | 13 September 1990 | Trader, entrepreneur |
| Toh Chin Chye | 杜进才 | 10 December 1921 | 3 February 2012 | Politician |
| Wee Cho Yaw | 黄祖耀 | | | Businessman, clan leader |
| Wee Chong Jin | 黃宗仁 | 28 September 1917 | 5 June 2005 | 1st Chief Justice of Singapore |
| Wee Kim Wee | 黄金辉 | 4 November 1915 | 2 May 2005 | Journalist, politician, 4th President of Singapore |
| Albert Winsemius | | 1910 | 4 December 1996 | Economist |
| Wong Kan Seng | 黄根成 | 1946 | | Politician |
| Wong Ming Yang | 黄名扬 | 1951 | 28 October 1982 | Doctor |
| Wong Peng Soon | | 1918 | 1996 | Sportsman |
| Wong Yip Yan | | | | Businessman |
| Lawrence Wong | 黄循财 | 18 December 1972 | | Politician |
| Woon Cheong Ming Walter | 温长明 | 12 September 1956 | | Lawyer, professor, politician, diplomat |
| Fiona Xie | 谢宛谕 | 24 January 1982 | | Actress, singer, presenter |
| Yam Ah Mee | 杨雅镁 | 2 July 1957 | | Returning officer |
| Yeo Yong-Boon George | 杨荣文 | 13 September 1954 | | Politician |
| Yeule (Nat Ćmiel) | | 16 December 1997 | | Songwriter, producer |
| Yong Pung How | 杨邦孝 | 11 April 1926 | 9 January 2020 | 2nd Chief Justice of Singapore |
| Rui En | 瑞恩 | 29 January 1981 | | Actress, singer |
| Subhas Anandan | | 25 December 1947 | 7 January 2015 | Lawyer |
| Youyi | 有懿 | 11 October 1980 | | Actress, host |
| David Bala | —N/a | 1947 | 29 August 2014 | Actor, comedian |
| Natasha Low | 劉怡伶 | 11 October 1993 | —N/a | Singer, host |
| Nathan Hartono | 向洋 | 26 July 1991 | —N/a | Actor, singer |
| Ferlyn Wong | 黃晶玲 | 1 February 1992 | —N/a | Singer |
| Vivian Lai | 赖怡伶 | 18 December 1976 | —N/a | Host |
| Kym Ng | 钟琴 | 1 July 1967 | —N/a | Television host, actress |
| Aloysius Pang (Wei Chong) | 冯伟衷 | 24 August 1990 | 24 January 2019 | Television actor, Singer |
| Amos Yee | 余澎杉 | 31 October 1998 | —N/a | Blogger, former YouTube personality and child actor |
