= Piya (disambiguation) =

Piya may refer to:

== Linguistics ==
- Piya, a classical Chinese dictionary compiled in the 11th century
- Piya language, a West Chadic language spoken in Bauchi State of Nigeria

== People ==
- Piya Chattopadhyay, Canadian journalist
- Piya Yaza Dewi (c. 1360s – c. 1392), Chief queen consort of Hanthawaddy
- Piya Sengupta (born 1970), Indian actress
- Piya Sorcar (born 1977), American social entrepreneur
- Piya Tan (born 1949), Malaysian scholar
