= Piya Tan =

Malaysian philosopher (born 1949)

Piya Tan 陈明信
- Born: 20 August 1949 (age 76); Malacca, Malaysia
- Occupations: Buddhist scholar, Dhamma teacher, Theravadin monk (former)
- Spouse: Ratna Lim
- Children: 1 daughter 1 son
- Website: dharmafarer.org

Piya Tan Beng Sin (Chinese: 陈明信; born 20 August 1949), also known as Piya Tan or Piyasilo (monastic name), is a Peranakan full-time lay Buddhist writer-cum-teacher in Singapore. He actively teaches the Buddha's Dharma, meditation and Pali to various Buddhist groups and organisations, and also works as a meditation therapist and counsellor at The Minding Centre (TMC). He is the first full-time lay Dharma worker ("Dharmacari") in Singapore to be supported by donations from the Buddhist community.

== Early life ==
As a youth, Piya was a self-confessed bookworm who loved the great outdoors, especially climbing Mount Ledang in Malaysia. On one such trip, while running after a butterfly to net it, he serendipitously stopped right at the edge of a cliff. During this near-death experience, the thought flashed across his mind that there are better things than catching butterflies. This was one of the major factors that led him to later become a monk. In his layman years before ordination, while Principal of the Seck Kia Eenh Dharma School (Malacca Buddhist Association), Malaysia, he prepared and implemented the Integrated Syllabus of Buddhist Studies, the most comprehensive Buddhist syllabus in Malaysia and Singapore then. As a monk, Piyasilo was best known for his national Dharma courses in Malaysia and Singapore and served as advisor or consultant to various tertiary Buddhist societies and Buddhist groups.

=== Ordination ===
He was a Theravada Buddhist monk for over 20 years. In 1970, he became a novice (samanera, pabbajjaa) in Wat Anandametyarama, Singapore, under HE Somdet Phra Vanarat (Poon Punnasiri of Wat Phra Jetubon), and on 24 June 1972, received his Higher Ordination (upasampadaa) from Somdet Phra Vanarat at Wat Srakes Rajavaramahavihara, Bangkok, Thailand, who some months later became the 17th Supreme Patriarch of the Thai Buddhist Order. During his first year in Thailand in 1972, he studied Thai. From 1973 to 1975, he successfully completed the Nak Tham series of ecclesiastical examination, attaining Nak Tham Ek (the highest grade). He went on to study at the Mahachulalongkorn Buddhist University in 1975. In 1974, while at Wat Srakes (Wat Saket), he acted as Ajahn Brahmavamso's interpreter before the latter was ordained by HE Phra Brahmagunabhorn, the abbot of Wat Srakes.

During his years in Thailand, he became close friends with the country's foremost Buddhist thinker, Chaokhun Prayudh Payutto, and the Buddhist social activist, Sulak Sivaraksa, who founded the International Network of Engaged Buddhists (INEB). In due course, Piya introduced a number of his students to Buddhist social work. In 1970, Piya co-founded The Young Buddhist Association of Malaysia as vice-president just before leaving for his monastic training in Thailand. During his tenure, he wrote the lyrics for The Anthem of Unity (music by Victor Wee). In due course, he founded the Friends of Buddhism Malaysia (1985) and the Friends of Buddhism Singapore (1986). During the same period, he started the 'Dharmafarers', a community of full-time lay Buddhist workers, the first of its kind in the two countries.

== Singapore ==
From 1982 to 1986, he was consultant and lecturer to the Buddhist Studies Team for Secondary Schools by the Ministry of Education. He was invited to join the team when available Buddhist textbooks were deemed by the Cambridge Examinations Syndicate as unsuitable for examination purposes. He presented his Integrated Syllabus to the Buddhist Studies Team, and working closely with the Project Director, Dr. Ang Beng Choo, they succeeded in making Buddhist Studies the most popular and successful of the Religious Studies subjects. The other important contribution Piya made to Singapore Buddhism in the 1980s was that he used his teachings and courses to successfully unify the Buddhist youth groups of Singapore into a fellowship network.

In 1990, Piyasilo left the Order to work as a layman. In 1994, in recognition of his Buddhist work (said to be "of PhD equivalent"), Prof Lewis Lancaster of the University of California at Berkeley's Dept. of East Asian Studies, invited him to the university as a visiting scholar. While there, he taught meditation, and was also a guest of the Berkeley Zen Center, where he became a close friend of Alan Senauke, and worked closely with the Buddhist Peace Fellowship.

In 1996, he married Ratna Lim, and they have two sons. In 2000, Piya and his family were invited by his ex-students to live and teach in Singapore, where he works as a full-time lay teacher. In Singapore, he is currently consultant and Dharma teacher to the following organizations:

- Singapore Buddhist Mission
- Poh Ern Shih Temple
- Poh Ming Tse Temple
- National University of Singapore Buddhist Society (NUSBS)
- Nanyang Technological University Buddhist Society (NTUBS)
- Various local polytechnics

Piya Tan giving a public meditation talk at the Jurong Regional Library on 25 November 2006

In 2001, an ex-student of his named Lee Chin Soo started a website for Piya; DharmaNet where his works during the early 2000s in Singapore are recorded. During his early years as a Theravada monk, he was privileged to learn insight meditation (Vipassana) directly from the venerable Mahasi Sayadaw himself in 1979. As a lay teacher, he learned the forest meditation directly from Ajahn Brahmavamso. Using the two systems, he has run numerous meditation courses and retreats for students and adults including non-Buddhists, as well as various organizations and corporations such as the Defence Science Organization, Singapore Airlines, and Hewlett-Packard et cetera. He is also personal meditation mentor to various public figures, and spiritual mentor to various young Buddhists. In Singapore, he runs Dharma, Sutta, Pali and meditation classes like the Introduction to Pali series, the Sutta Study Group at NUS Buddhist Society (since Feb 2003), the English Dharma Courses and the Sutta Discovery classes at The Buddhist Fellowship (BF) and The Singapore Buddhist Mission.

In 2006, he started The Minding Centre, a Dharma and right livelihood activity centre, where he teaches the Suttas he has translated and runs the Piya's Meditation Courses, a blend of the Forest & Insight methods for the public. Piya is a regular teacher at the Brahm Education Centre (BEC) where he has been running the popular Meditation for Beginners classes since Jan 2004, and other courses. He lives with his family at Pali House, where he works full-time on the Sutta translation project.

=== Sutta translation work ===
The Sutta Discovery Series, an annotated translation of the early Pali Suttas (the 4 Nikayas), incorporates some of the best elements of Western academic standards with the excellence of the Buddhist spiritual traditions. The approach blends both scriptural understanding and meditation practice. The Sutta Discovery translations have been endorsed and used by various monks, such as Ajahn Sujato of Australia, Bhante Aggacitta of Malaysia and Ven S Pemaratana of Sri Lanka.

Despite being "digitally challenged", he launched the Dharmafarer website single-handedly in late 2006, where his annotated Sutta translations and works are made freely available online. Despite his heavy teaching and work schedule, he continue to conduct the free weekly Sutta classes at NUSBS, the Buddhist Fellowship and the TMC where he proof-reads and studies his Sutta translations with a group of serious Buddhists learners tirelessly to this day.

== Education ==
Year	Qualification Attained
1994	Visiting Scholar, University of California at Berkeley, U.S.
1973–1975	Passed all three Nak Tham (Ecclesiastical Dhamma) levels in the Thai language, attaining Nak Tham Ek (Dhamma 1st grade)
1975–1992	Worked as a monk serving especially Malaysia and Singapore
1970–1975	Completed his monastic training (Nissaya) in Thailand
1967–1968	"A" levels, Melaka High School, Melaka (Malacca)
1962–1966	"O" levels, Gajah Berang Secondary English School, Melaka, Malaysia
1957–1961	Tranquerah English School, Melaka, Malaysia

== List of works ==
As Piyasilo, he had a special interest in the sociology of religion, and wrote many ground-breaking and educational books on Buddhism such as Total Buddhist Work (1983) and social surveys (such as Buddhist Currents and Charisma in Buddhism, 1992), and spoke at various international and inter-religious forums. In 1984, Apple Computer declared him "Apple User of the Year," effectively making him one of the first monks to "computerize". He is well known for his futuristic visions of Buddhism, especially in terms of the full-time lay Buddhist ministry.

As supported by donations, most of Piya's works were published in limited prints only. A few numbers can still be found by selected booksellers.

=== Books ===
1. 1983 – The Total Buddhist Work [Buddhist missiology]
2. 1984 – Basic Buddhist Meditation Practice (2nd ed.)
3. 1986a – Dhammapada Stories
4. 1986b – The Great Disciples of the Buddha
5. 1987 – Reprinted Life of the Buddha (Rockhill)
6. 1987c – Padmasambhava – the Man and the Myth
7. 1987d – Life of the Buddha
8. 1987e – Jataka Stories (2nd ed.)
9. 1988 – Reprinted Buddha's Discourses for Beginners(Mahachulalongkorn, Bangkok, 1985)
10. 1988b – Buddhist Law [the Vinaya]
11. 1988c – Buddhist Economics [Right Livelihood]
12. 1988e – Campus Buddhist Growth (ltd. ed.) [Campus missiology]
13. 1988f – Metta Sutta (Pali, translation, footnotes on Pali, commentarial endnotes)
14. 1988g – Buddhist Culture (Buddhism and society)
15. 1989a – Mandala of the Five Buddhas [On the 5 archetypal Buddhas]
16. 1989b – Kosa Kata Buddhis (English-Malay Buddhist dictionary)
17. 1989c – Pedoman Bahasa Malaysia Buddhis (guidelines for Buddhist translation into Malay)
18. 1989d – Translating Buddhist Sutras [report on translation problems]
19. 1989e – Book of Discourses, Vol. 1 (Sutta Nipata translation) [600+ pages unpublished manuscript]
20. 1989f – The Chapter of the Snake (Sutta Nipata, Uraga Vagga translation)
21. 1989h – Prolegomena to Buddhist Studies (General Guide 2) [A survey of early Buddhism and its scriptural traditions: unpublished manuscript]
22. 1990 – Nichiren: the New Buddhism of Modern Japan (2nd repr)
23. 1990a – Kamus Buddhist Caturbahasa [Sanskrit-Pali-English-Malay glossary]
24. 1990b – Love & Marriage: A Buddhist Perspective (et al.)
25. 1990c – Buddhist Prayer
26. 1990d – The Puja Book vol. 1 [traditional chants]; vol. 2 [Buddhist rites]: interpaginal. English/Pali. [Vols. 3–4 uncompleted.]
27. 1990e – Buddhist Psychology
28. 1990f – A Guide to Buddhist Studies (General Guide 1) [Abbreviations, conventions, and bibliographies: incomplete manuscript]
29. 1991a – The Origin and Meaning of Avalokitesvara [1988a] 2nd ed.
30. 1991b – The Buddha's Teachings [1987a] 2nd ed. [Introduction to Buddhist doctrines]
31. 1991c – Introduction to Buddhism [Bangkok 1973] 3rd ed.
32. 1991d – Values, Character and Humanity [occasional paper]
33. 1991e – The Buddhist Way Towards a Better Environment [occasional paper]
34. 1991f – Socially Engaged Holy Life [Bangkok INEB keynote address]
35. 1991g – Charisma in Buddhism [a sociological survey with case studies] ISBN 983-9030-10-8
36. 1991h Puja (for Daily Practice, etc.) [booklet]
37. 1991i – Buddhist Prayer: Meaning, Aspiration and Wisdom
38. 1991j – Dictionary of Buddhist Terms [incomplete manuscript]
39. 1991k – Dictionary of Buddhist Quotations [incomplete manuscript]
40. 1992a – Buddhist Currents: A brief social analysis of Buddhism in Sri Lanka and Siam. ISBN 983-9030-04-3
41. 1992b – New Directions in Buddhism today. ISBN 983-9030-03-5
42. 2001 – Divine Qualities of Spiritual Dialogue The Singapore Bahai Studies Review Vol 6: pp. 109–127. [Paper delivered at the Dialogue Among Civilisations Conference, National University of Singapore, 2001]

=== Free Booklets Series – Buddhism for the Millions ===
The following were published in limited prints only (supported by donations):

1. The Four Spiritual Laws: the Buddhist answer to evangelism
2. Be a Winner! (Daily application of the 4 Spiritual Powers)
3. Puja Card (Tiratana Vandana & Basic Puja)
4. A Buddhist Revival (Dharmafarer guide and prospectus)
5. Mandala (Buddhist economics in practice in Malaysia and Singapore) brochure
6. Buddhist Handbook (with Chinese or Malay translation)
7. Is This Our Only Life? (The Buddhist doctrine of rebirth)
8. Basic Buddhist Meditation Practice
9. What Not to Look For in a Religion (Kesaputtiya Sutta) (Apologetics)
10. Objections to Buddhism (Comments on contemporary Buddhism)
11. Say No! to the Evangelists (Answering the Evangelists)
12. Rafts of Dharma (Buddhist leadership growth)
13. On Being Your True Self (Inspirational)
14. Who Should Recite Mantras? (Apologetics)
15. Lesson of the Four-faced "Buddha" (Buddhist adaptation of Brahma)
16. On Being a Mitra (Full-time lay Buddhist ministry)
17. Why People Fail? (motivational)
18. Is this the Dharma Ending Age? (Eschatology)
19. Five Precepts, Five Virtues (Hermeneutics)

=== Web Essays ===
1. Piya Tan (2006). "Bad friendship: avoiding unwholesome teacher-pupil relationships" (PDF). dharmafarer.org. themindingcentre.org.
2. Piya Tan (2010). "Nīvaraṇa : The five barriers to mental focus and how to break through them" (PDF). dharmafarer.org. themindingcentre.org.
3. Piya Tan (2007). "Group Karma? An early Buddhist perspective" (PDF). dharmafarer.org. themindingcentre.org.

== See also ==
- Lee Choon Seng
- Teresa Hsu Chih
- Venerable Ho Yuen Hoe
