= Wywy Group of Companies =

The Wywy Group of Companies is a Singapore conglomerate founded by billionaire Wong Yip Yan in 1976. According to Bloomberg Businessweek, the Wywy Group was one of Asia’s largest non-real estate conglomerates. The Wywy group controls 76 companies, with annual sales of over $900 million. Main business lines for the Wywy Group are consumer electronics, entertainment centers, and America-style restaurants. The Group was headquartered in the Wywy Industrial building on 12 Hoy Fatt Road in Singapore’s Redhill district.

Wong Yip Yan owns 100% of the shares of the Wywy Group.
