= Sun Yat Sen Nanyang Memorial Hall =

Villa and museum in Balestier, Singapore

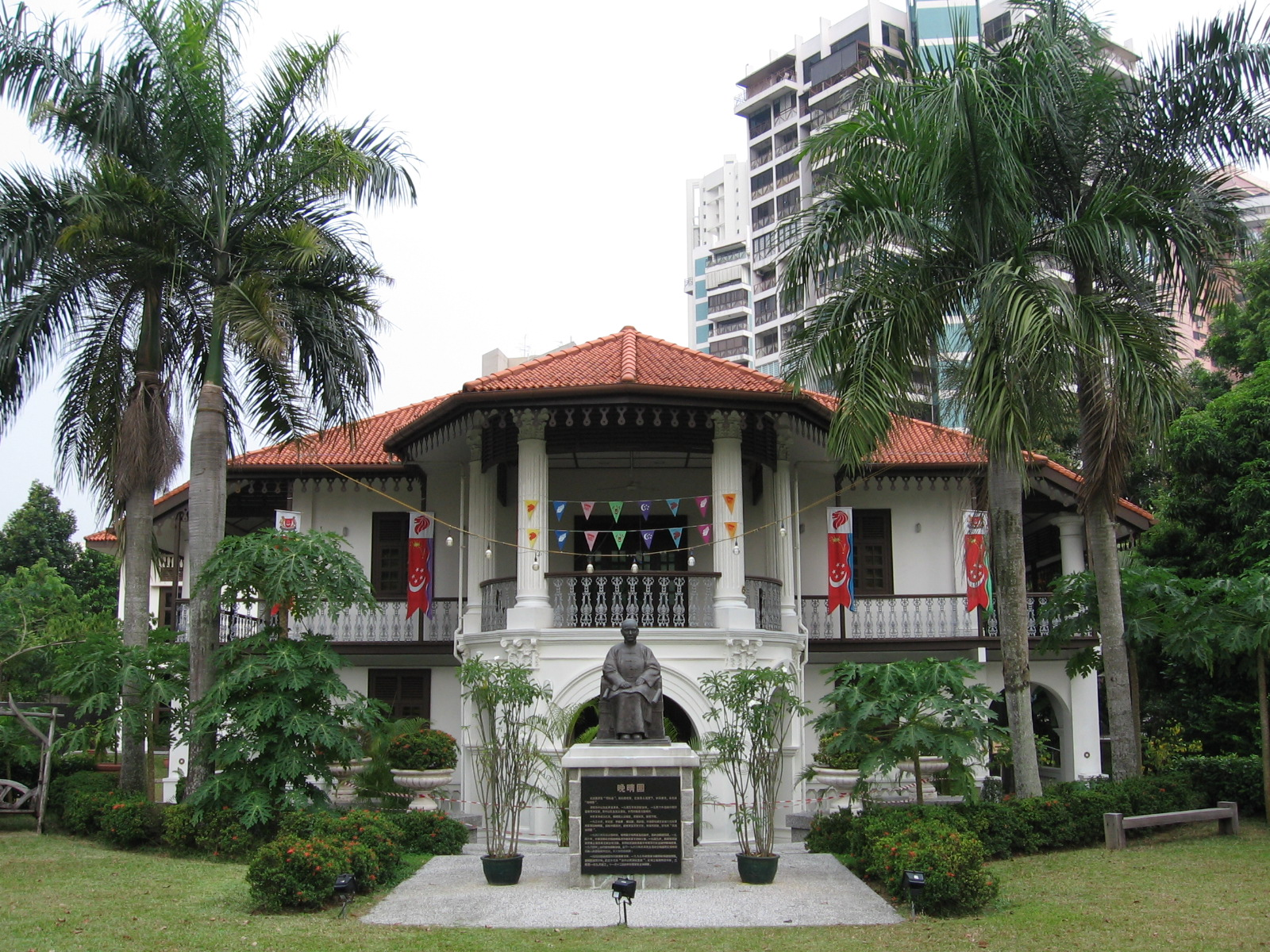
- Established: 1901
- Location: Balestier, Novena, Singapore
- Coordinates: 1°19′41″N 103°50′49″E
- Collection size: Artefacts from the Xinhai Revolution and life of Sun Yat-sen
- Website: www.wanqingyuan.org.sg

National monument of Singapore
- Designated: 28 October 1994; 31 years ago
- Reference no.: 33

Sun Yat Sen Nanyang Memorial Hall
- Traditional Chinese: 孫中山南洋紀念館
- Simplified Chinese: 孙中山南洋纪念馆
Transcriptions
Standard Mandarin
- Hanyu Pinyin: Sūn Zhōngshān Nányáng Jìniàn Guǎn

Wan Qing Yuan
- Traditional Chinese: 晚晴園
- Simplified Chinese: 晚晴园
Transcriptions
Standard Mandarin
- Hanyu Pinyin: Wǎn Qíng Yuán

Sun Yat Sen Villa
- Traditional Chinese: 孫中山故居
- Simplified Chinese: 孙中山故居
Transcriptions
Standard Mandarin
- Hanyu Pinyin: Sūn Zhōngshān Gùjū

Logo of Sun Yat Sen Nanyang Memorial Hall

The Sun Yat Sen Nanyang Memorial Hall, also known as Wan Qing Yuan, and formerly as the Sun Yat Sen Villa, is a two-story colonial style villa in Balestier, Singapore. The villa is now a museum commemorating Sun Yat Sen (1866–1925), the founding father of the Republic of China who visited Singapore nine times between 1900 and 1911.

Located at 12 Tai Gin Road off Ah Hood Road in Balestier, the villa occupies an area of approximately 3,120 square metres (33,600 sq ft) and played a crucial role in the 1911 Xinhai Revolution by serving as the Tongmenghui's base in Nanyang (Southeast Asia) in the early 20th century.

== History ==
The villa was designed in 1900 and built in 1901 by Boey Chuan Poh (梅春輔; 1874-1926), a businessman who owned the newspaper Union Times. The villa was rumoured to be a home for his mistress Bin Chan, hence it was called "Bin Chan House". In 1902, Boey sold the villa for $10,800 to Lim Ah Siang (林亞相; 1866-1925), the towkay of a timber business in Johor and Singapore and the leader of the Teochew secret society Ngee Heng Kongsi. The building was constructed in a classical colonial style, featuring ornate arched windows and doors, eaves decorated with floral patterns, and movable louvred windows.

In 1905, rubber magnate Teo Eng Hock (張永福; 1872–1957) bought the villa for his mother, Tan Poh Neo, as a place of retirement and renamed it "Wan Qing Yuan". In July 1905, Sun Yat Sen met Teo, Tan Chor Lam (陳楚南; 1884–1971) and Lim Nee Soon in Singapore through his close friend, Yau Lit, while en route to Europe from Japan. In April 1906, when Sun visited Singapore again, Teo offered his villa for use as the Tongmenghui's headquarters in Southeast Asia. At the villa, the Tongmenghui planned numerous uprisings and fundraising activities leading to the 1911 Xinhai Revolution, which ended imperial rule in China under the Qing dynasty. Three uprisings of the Xinhai Revolution – Chaozhou Uprising (May 1907), Zhennanguan Uprising (December 1907), and Hekou Uprising (April 1908) – were planned in the villa. Teo and his wife, Tan Sok Jee, sewed the flag of the Republic of China in the villa.

After Teo sold the villa in 1912, the villa changed ownership multiple times until it was purchased in 1937 by six Chinese leading businessmen in Singapore: Lee Kong Chian (李光前; 1893–1967), Tan Ean Kiam (陳延謙; 1881–1943), Lee Chin Tian (李振殿), Chew Hean Swee (周獻瑞; 1884–1960), Lee Choon Seng (李俊承; 1888—1966) and Yeo Kiat Tiow (楊吉兆). In the following year, they donated the villa to the Singapore Chinese Chamber of Commerce (SCCCI). After the establishment of the Republic of China, the Nationalist government funded the refurbishment of the villa and converted it into a memorial hall in 1940. At the same time, they gathered information and artefacts related to Sun Yat Sen from overseas Chinese communities and opened the hall to the public.

During the Japanese occupation of Singapore (1942–1945), the Japanese military used the villa as a communication base and Kempeitai branch office. Many of the original artefacts and furniture of the hall were destroyed. After the war, the Nationalist government funded the restoration of the villa and set up the Singapore branch of the Kuomintang there. However, following the Communist victory in the Chinese Civil War and founding of the People's Republic of China in October 1949, the British colonial proscription of the KMT as an unlawful organisation, and a lack of foreign exchange sufficient to maintain the centre, the house closed down as a political office. In 1951, the SCCCI regained ownership of the villa and renamed it the "Sun Yat Sen Villa" after renovations in 1964.

On 28 October 1994, the Singapore government gazetted the villa as a National Monument. Two years later, the SCCCI renamed the villa to "Sun Yat Sen Nanyang Memorial Hall" and announced its plans to expand the place. The villa closed in November 1997 for restoration works at a cost of S$7.5 million. It was reopened to the public as a museum on 12 November 2001. In 2009, the SCCCI appointed the National Heritage Board (NHB) to manage the museum, and redevelopment works took place in October 2010. One year later, the villa was reopened to the public on 8 October 2011 by then Deputy Prime Minister and Minister for Home Affairs Teo Chee Hean to commemorate the centenary of the Xinhai Revolution, who is also the grandnephew of Teo Eng Hock.

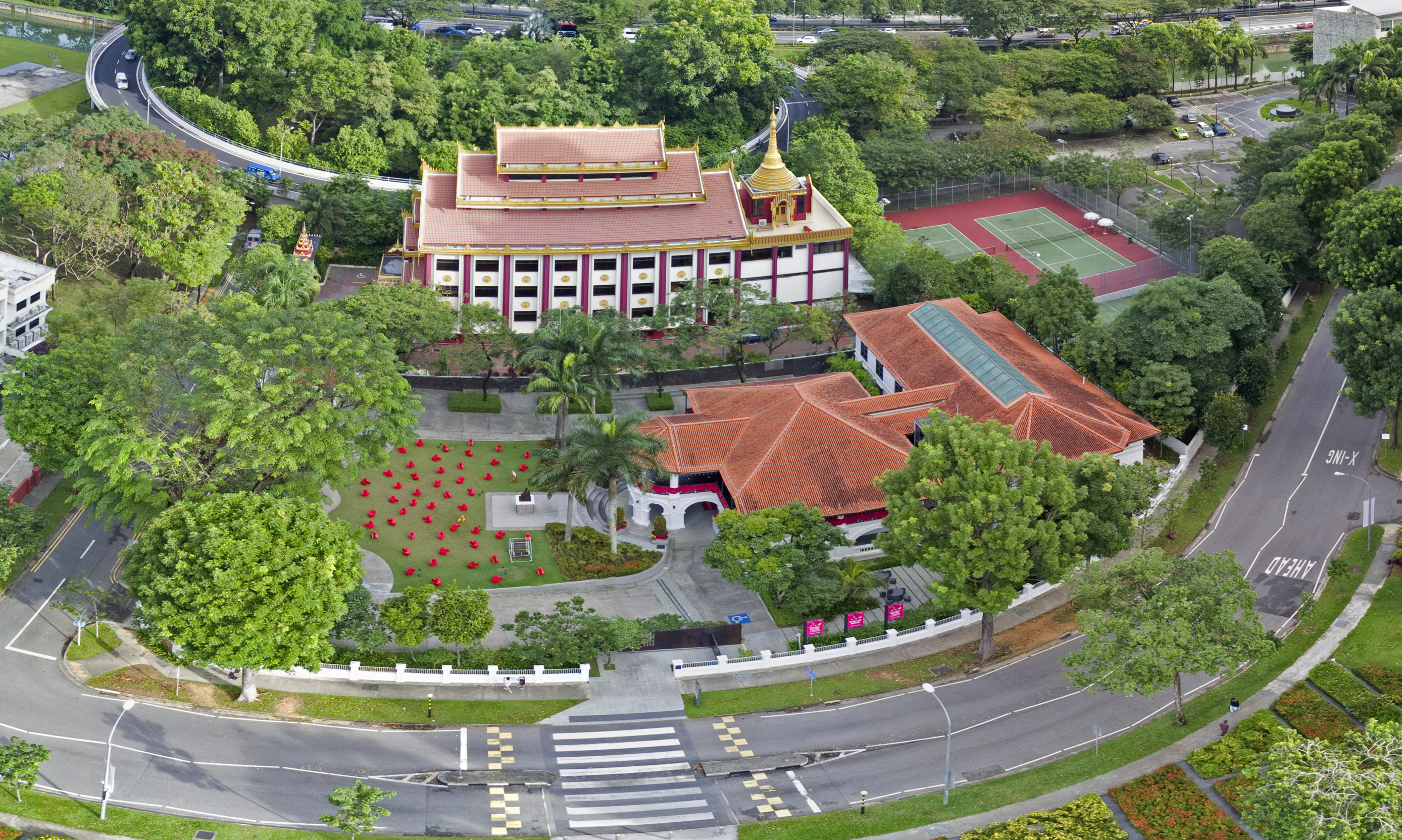
Aerial photograph of Sun Yat Sen Nanyang Memorial Hall in Singapore

== Current status ==
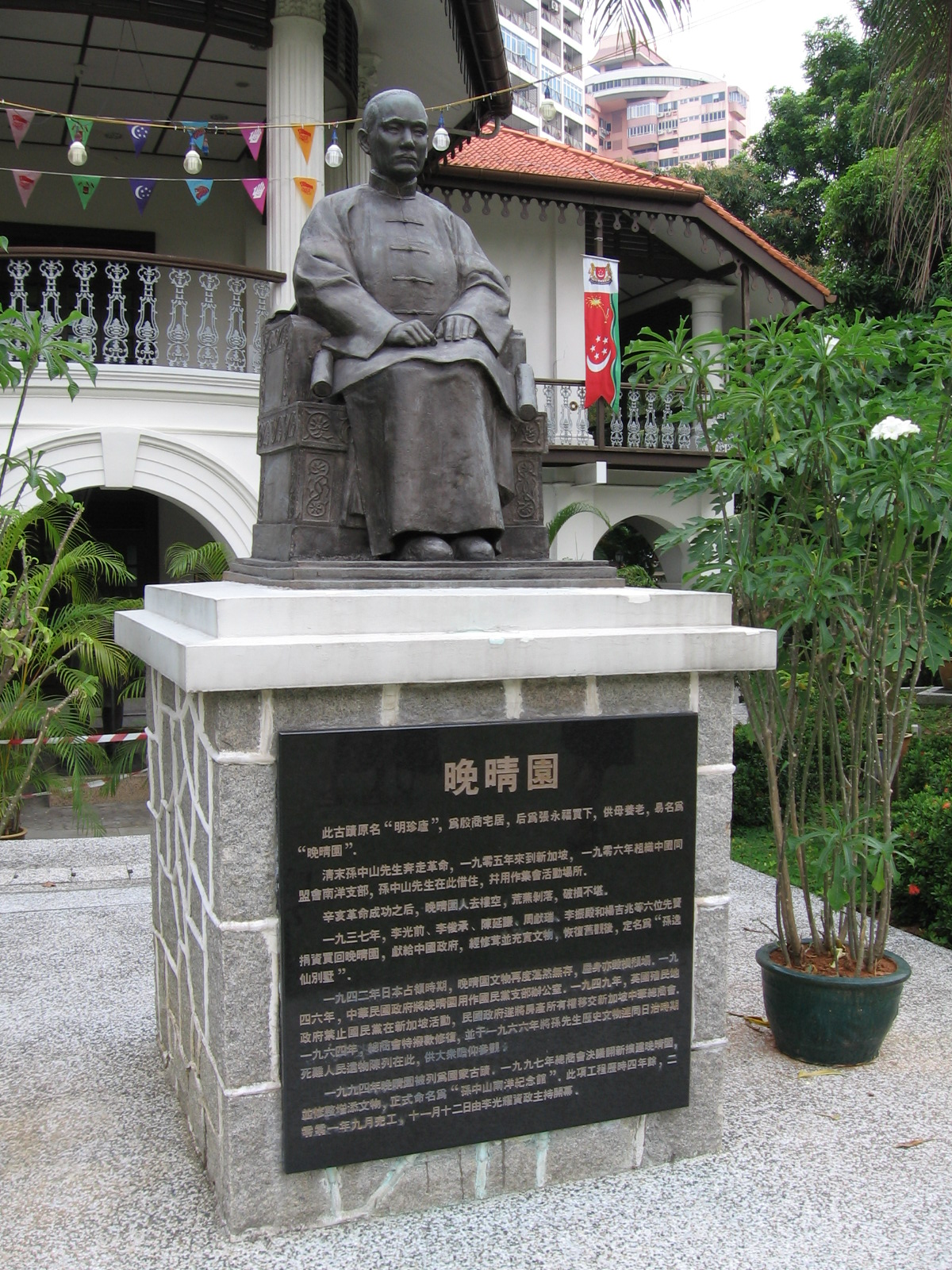
Sculpture of Sun Yat Sen seated on a chair

The villa currently houses a collection of nearly 400 artefacts, including calligraphy works, photographs, old books, paintings and sculptures, spread throughout the five galleries in two levels. The villa is redecorated in the style of an old Peranakan house and has 180 new artefacts added. The Lee Foundation paid for most of the paintings, the bronze wall mural, and bronze statues and busts, which were worth over S$1.5 million in total. Just alongside the villa is Zhongshan Park, also named after Sun Yat Sen, an integrated hotel, commercial and retail development completed in 2013. Connecting the development to the villa is a similarly named 0.46 ha (4,600 m^{2}) public park.

=== Highlights ===
- A two-metre tall bronze wall mural which spans 60 metres to the back of the building and depicts Singapore's history from the 1840s to the 1940s. It was sculpted by artists from China between 1999 and early 2005 at a cost of around S$1 million. It depicts scenes of Singapore as a fishing village in the 1840s and the Sook Ching massacre in 1942.
- Bronze statues scattered around the garden, including those of persons who helped Sun Yat Sen in the Xinhai Revolution. There is a one-metre tall sculpture of Sun Yat Sen seated on a chair, which was presented by the Chinese government in 1937. More bronze sculptures of Sun Yat Sen line the hallway leading to the museum's entrance.
- Oil and watercolour paintings and calligraphy works by Singaporean and Chinese artists, such as painter Liu Kang, Buddhist monk and renowned calligrapher, Venerable Song Nian (松年法師), and Cultural Medallion-winning artists Ong Kim Seng and Tan Swie Hian. These are found in the galleries on the second level.
- Photograph of Sun Yat Sen and members of the Tongmenghui's Singapore branch, taken at Wan Qing Yuan around 1906.
- Nanyang and the Founding of the Republic, the Memoir of Teo Eng Hock, a book by Teo Eng Hock, providing a detailed record of the Tongmenghui's activities in Southeast Asia.
- Wan Qing Yuan and the Chinese Revolution, a recollection by Tan Chor Lam, a book printed in the 1940s, containing records of the Tongmenghui's activities in Singapore.
- A work of Chinese calligraphy, bearing the Chinese characters bo ai (博愛; "universal love"), presented by Sun Yat Sen to Teo Eng Hock's nephew, Teo Beng Wan.
- Seal belonging to Tan Chor Lam, engraved with the Chinese characters jie ai guo yuan (結愛國緣; "love for country and fellow countrymen").

== See also ==
- Sun Yat-sen Mausoleum
- Sun Yat-sen Memorial Hall
- Sun Yat Sen Memorial House
- Sun Yat Sen Memorial Park
