= Sumangalo =

Personal life
- Born: Robert Stuart Clifton; 1903 Birmingham, Alabama, United States
- Died: February 1963 (aged 59–60) Penang, Malaysia
- Occupation: Buddhist monk

Religious life
- Religion: Buddhism

Venerable Sumangalo was a Buddhist monk ordained in both Theravada Buddhism and Mahayana Buddhism, and actively involved in Dhamma propagation works in both Singapore and Malaysia.

== Biography ==
Venerable Sumangalo(1903–1963) was born as Robert Stuart Clifton in Birmingham, Alabama in the United States in 1903. After receiving his Doctorate in Literature, he lectured on Buddhism in the United States before moving to Asia to further his study of Buddhism. He received his first ordination (tokudo) on February 12, 1933, from Rev. Kenju Masuyama, bishop of the Buddhist Mission of North America (later reorganized as the Buddhist Churches of America). In 1934 he served as the director of the San Francisco Buddhist Society, under the sponsorship of the BMNA. He received his second tokudo ordination in Kyoto from Nishi Honganji, on October 17, 1934, and full kaikyoshi certification from Honganji on December 19, 1934. He returned to the United States, where he published often in BMNA and other Buddhist publication, including a stint as the editor of the Golden Lotus, a Theosophy-influenced Buddhist magazine. In 1952 he requested for a letter of authority from Nishi-Honganji to found a “Western Buddhist Order.” This request was denied. Nevertheless, Clifton created the Western Buddhist Order on October 24, 1952, with two other Caucasian Buddhists who had been ordained in the Nishi Honganji tradition: Ernest Hunt of Honolulu and Jack Austin of London.

In 1957, he re-ordained into the Theravada Order in Laos and received the monastic name "Sumangalo", meaning "very auspicious". He then left for Malaya and later visited Singapore on a Dharma tour in late 1959 with another American Buddhist monk, Venerable Susiddhi. Through his efforts, a number of Youth Circles and Sunday schools were set up locally.

== Pioneering Buddhist Youth Movement in Malaya ==
Venerable Sumangalo, who is well known as the Father of Malaysian Buddhist Youth Movement. He urged the establish of the Federation of Malaya Buddhist Youth Fellowship (FMBYF) on 24 December 1958 which was the first national Buddhist youth organization in the Peninsular Malaya then with the objective to unite the Buddhist youth in the new born nation. The Young Buddhist Association of Malaysia (YBAM) set up the Sumangalo Award in 1995 to commemorate Venerable Sumangalo for his great compassion, contributions and pioneering spirit in the Buddhist youth movement in Malaysia.

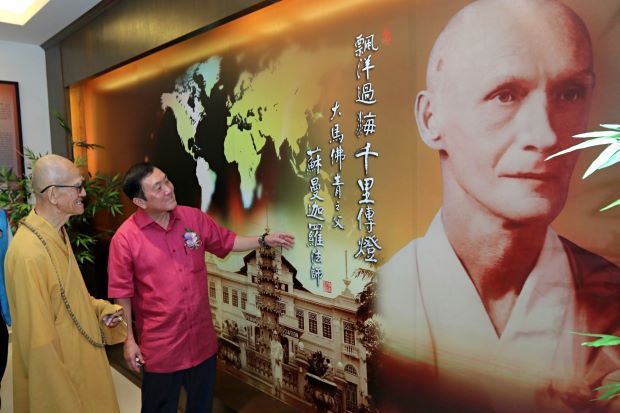
Father Sumangalo Memorial Hall is located in Penang, Malaysia

== Abbotship in Singapore ==
In January 1959 he was offered the honorary abbotship of Poh Ern Shih Temple, thus becoming the first Westerner to be the abbot of a Buddhist temple in Singapore. While in Singapore, he assisted Pitt Chin Hui in her translation of the Ksitigarbha Bodhisattva Sutra from Chinese to English. He returned to Malaya and spent his later years at Penang Buddhist Association, where most of his Dharma lectures were held. His lectures were later compiled in English and Chinese and are still freely distributed. Venerable Sumangalo died on 6 February 1963 and was cremated in Penang.
