= Pasir Panjang =

Subzone of Queenstown Planning Area, Singapore

- Subzone of Queenstown Planning Area

Other transcription(s)
  - Chinese: 巴西班让 (Simplified) 巴西班讓 (Traditional); Bāxī Bānràng (Pinyin); Pa-se Pan-jiāng (Hokkien POJ)
  - Malay: Pasir Panjang (Rumi) ڤاسير ڤنجڠ (Jawi)
  - Tamil: பாசிர் பாஞ்சாங் Pācir Pāñcāṅ (Transliteration)
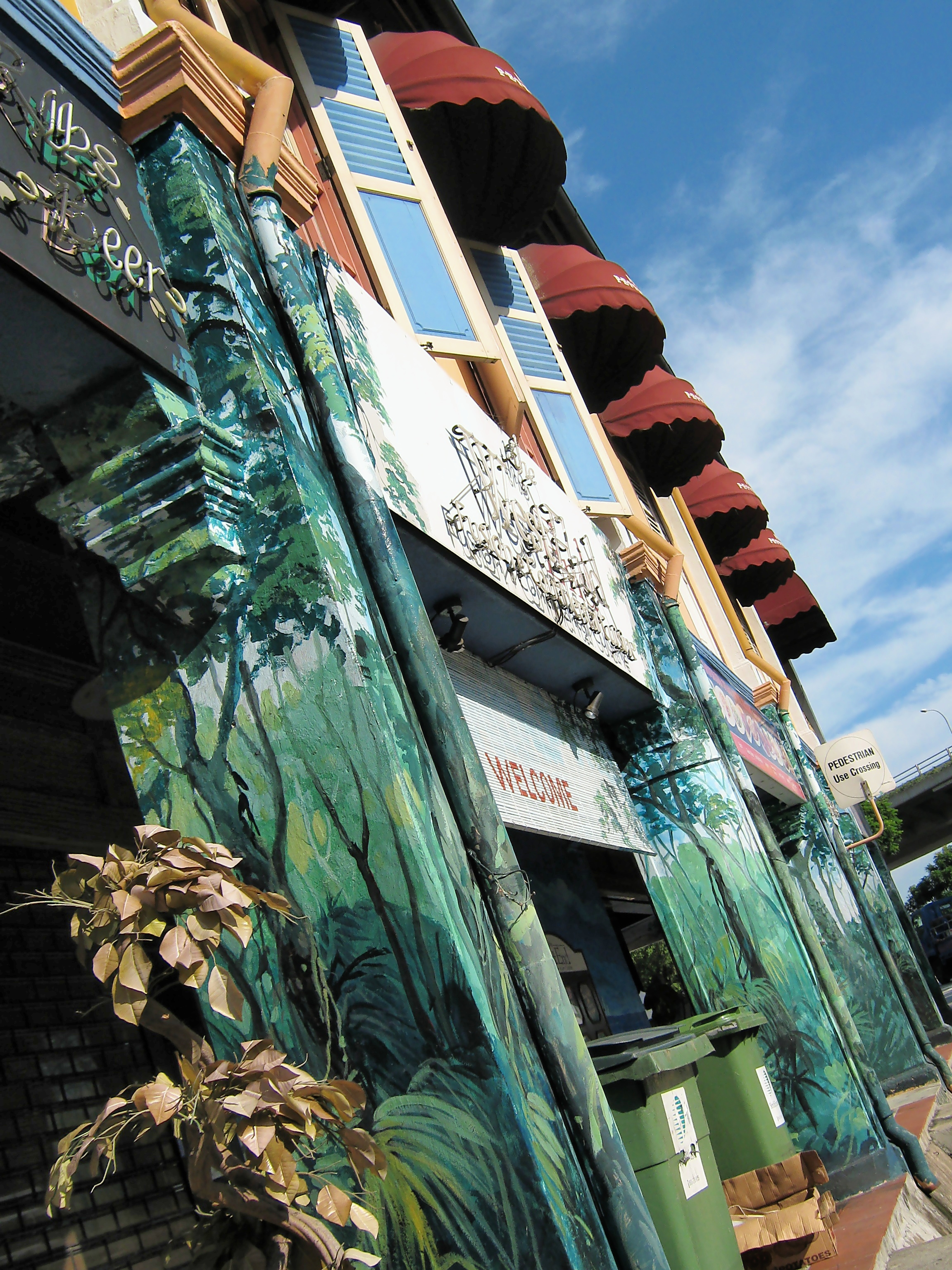
- Pasir Panjang Village, along Pasir Panjang Road
- Interactive map of Pasir Panjang
- Coordinates: 1.281°N 103.79°E

Pasir Panjang (Note: IPA: /ˈpɑːseɪ ˌpɑːndʒɑːŋ/ PAH-say PAHN-jahng) is an area located at the southern part of Queenstown in Singapore. Kent Ridge Park is a topographical feature which runs adjacent to Pasir Panjang.

== History ==
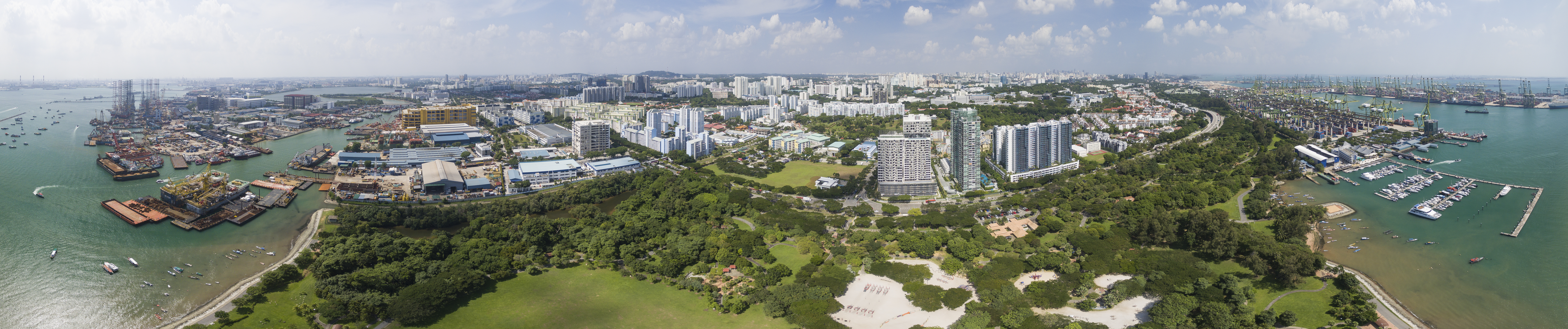
Aerial panorama of Singapore's west coast with West Coast park and Pasir Panjang Terminal taking centre stage, shot 2016.

Pasir Panjang Road, which once hugged the coastline, was laid down as far as the Jurong River by John Turnbull Thomson by 1850. Thomson was Government Surveyor of Singapore from 1841 to 1853.

In 1910, the Government took over the opium industry and a state-owned factory was established at Pasir Panjang. In February 1942, the Battle of Pasir Panjang took place here. This was one of Singapore's last major battle between the Japanese and the British armed forces. The Japanese victory resulted in the Fall of Singapore. Many soldiers from the 1st Malaya Infantry Brigade such as Adnan bin Saidi died here.

Since the late 1960s, the whole length of the coast, from the Singapore River to Jurong, has been reclaimed for wharves, almost entirely devoted to containerisation. The coastal area at Pasir Panjang has also been extensively reclaimed for the Pasir Panjang Terminal of the Port of Singapore.

== Highlights ==
=== Pasir Panjang Pillbox ===
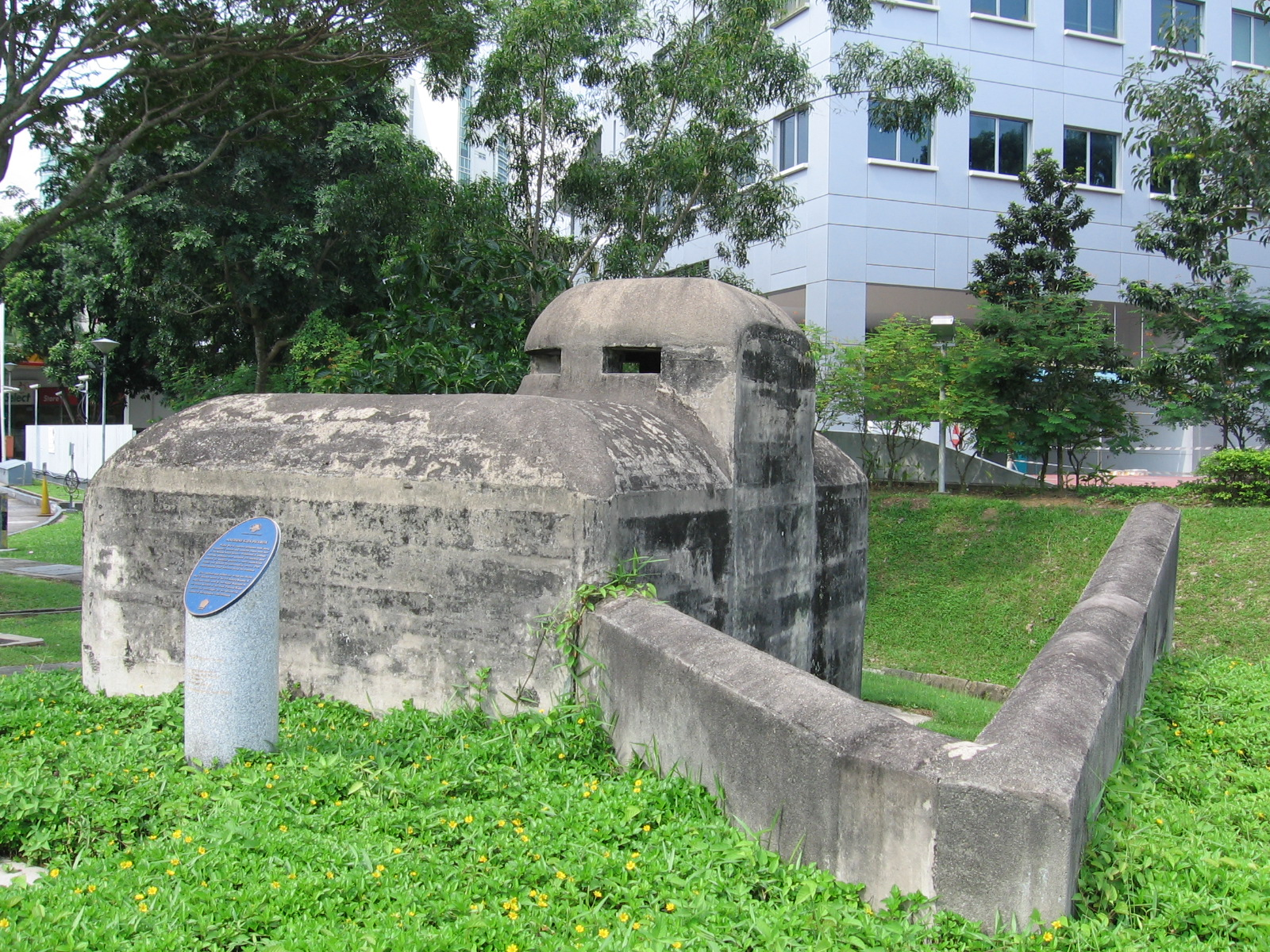
Pasir Panjang Pillbox

Pasir Panjang Pillbox is a concrete machine-gun pillbox built before the Japanese invasion of Malaya and Singapore and sits beside Pasir Panjang Road. During the war, it was on the coast; however, due to post war land reclamation, it is now .75 km from the sea.

=== Pasir Panjang Terminal ===
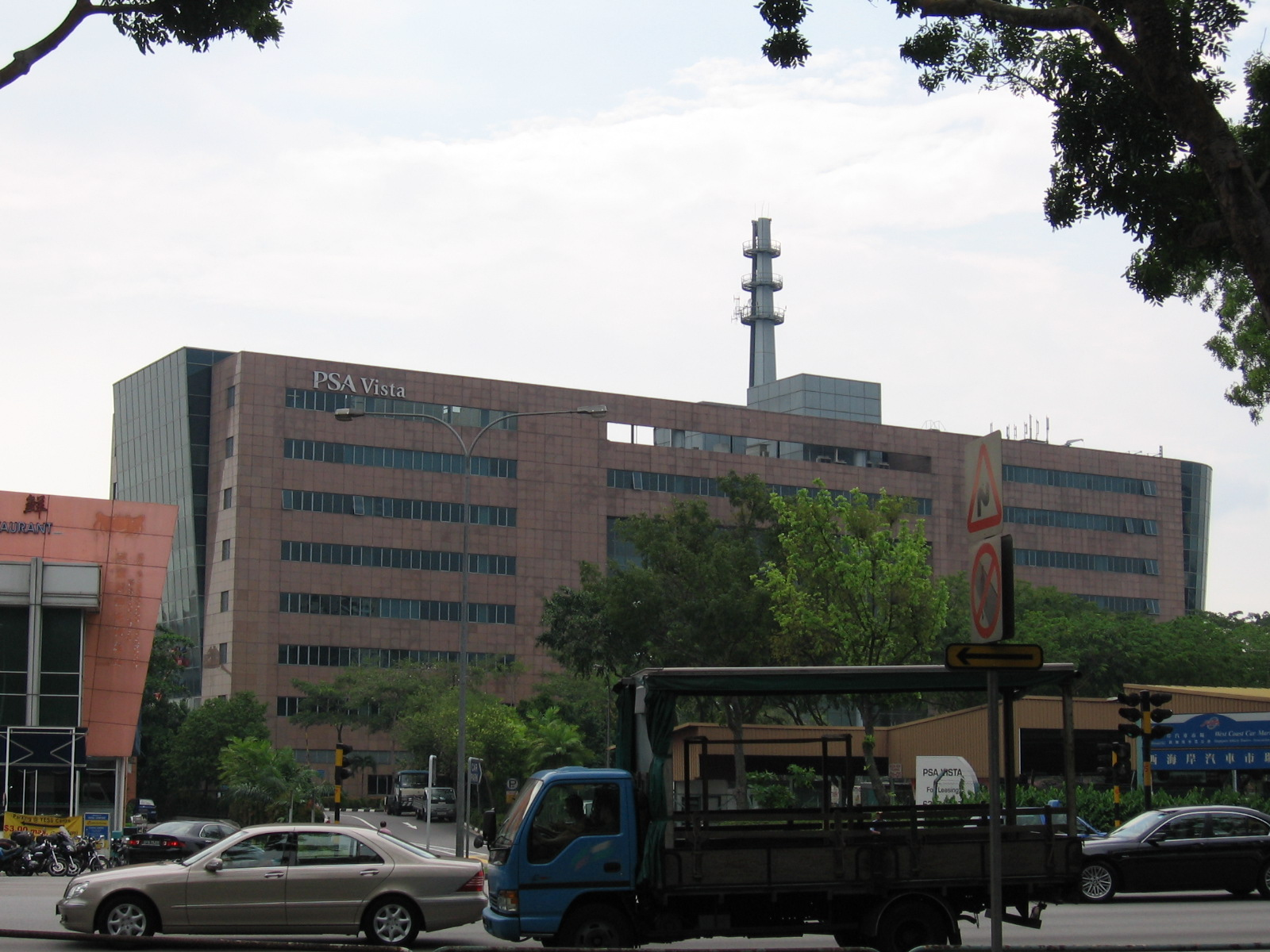
PSA Vista building at Pasir Panjang Terminal.

In 1993, the Port of Singapore Authority (PSA), now corporatised as PSA International, started constructing a new container terminal at Pasir Panjang, the Pasir Panjang Terminal. it is located approximately 7 km west of the company's other container terminals at Keppel Harbour. This new, S$7 billion terminal, represents an immense expansion of PSA's container port. When fully completed in 2009, it is expected to raise PSA's container handling capacity by a further 18 million twenty-foot equivalent units (TEU) per year. The terminal's first four berths, of the planned 26, opened in 1998, with two more berths becoming operational by the time of the terminal's official opening in March 2000. The terminal is slated to cease operations by the year 2040 when the Tuas Megaport is completed and all of PSA assets will be transferred to the new port.

COSCO Shipping Ports, formerly COSCO Pacific, is a co-investor.

=== Old Pasir Panjang Police Sub-station ===
In 1986, the old Singapore Police Force Pasir Panjang Police Sub-station was vacated after almost four decades of service, its duty and areas of jurisdiction taken over by Pasir Panjang NPP and West Coast NPP respectively. Originally constructed in 1950, its location near the crossroad junction of Clementi Road, Pasir Panjang Road and West Coast Road provided the local residents of the many Malay kampungs dotted around the road and area with the security of a police presence. The old building was torn down in 1991 and the land levelled. The site is now a new condominium apartment – The Spectrum, which is built directly over the old police building and the surrounding land.

=== Poh Ern Shih Temple ===
Poh Ern Shih Temple (报恩寺) was built in 1954 by the famous businessman and devoted Buddhist, Mr Lee Choon Seng. The Buddhist temple was dedicated to Kṣitigarbha Bodhisattva and was built as a memorial to those who lost their lives during the Battle of Pasir Panjang in 1942. It is located on a small hilltop at Chwee Chian Road, off Pasir Panjang Road, along Singapore's southern coast.
