= Poh Ern Shih Temple =

Buddhist temple in Singapore

- 报恩寺
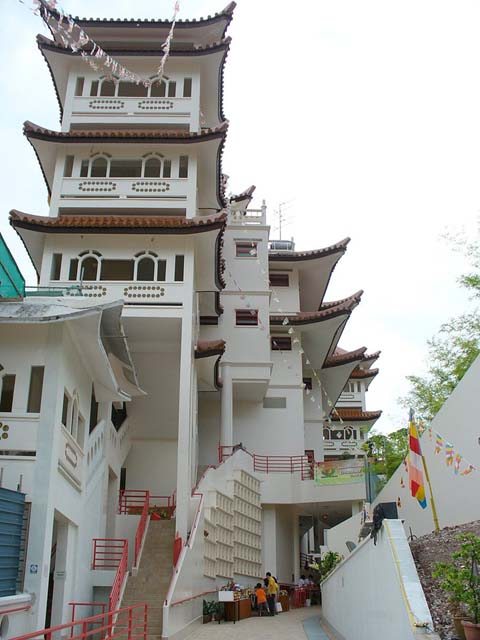
- Poh Ern Shih

- Location within Singapore
- Interactive map of Poh Ern Shih Temple

Monastery information
- Full name: Poh Ern Shih Temple
- Order: Theravada, Mahayana
- Established: 1954

People
- Founders: Lee Choon Seng, Sumangalo, Pitt Chin Hui

Site
- Location: 9 Chwee Chian Road, Singapore
- Coordinates: 01°16′45″N 103°47′19″E
- Website: pohernshih.sg

Poh Ern Shih (Chinese: 報恩寺; pinyin: bào'ēnsì; lit. 'Temple of Thanksgiving') is located on a small hilltop at Chwee Chian Road, off Pasir Panjang Road, on Singapore's southern coast. The Buddhist temple was built as a memorial to those who lost their lives during the Battle of Pasir Panjang in 1942, villagers as well as Allied and Japanese soldiers. The temple's first abbot, Sumangalo, an American Theravadin monk, was the first Westerner to be appointed abbot of a Buddhist temple in Singapore.

The old Poh Ern Shih Temple before it was demolished in 2003 to make way for a new and bigger building

Following a major development project which began in 2003, Poh Ern Shih became the first religious building in the country to incorporate both eco-friendly and elderly-friendly features. Together with its partner, the Buddhist Fellowship, the temple conducts programmes such as Dharma talks, Sutta discussions and meditation courses in Chinese and English for the Buddhist community.

== History ==
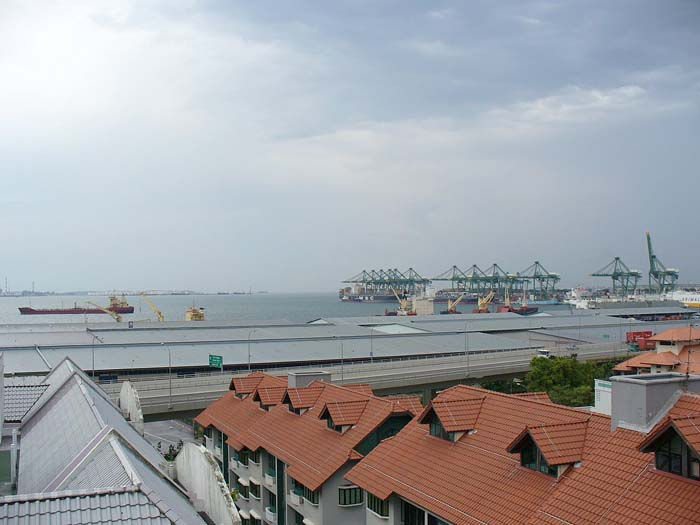
Scenic view of Pasir Panjang from Chwee Chian Hill where the temple stands today

Poh Ern Shih is located on the top of Chwee Chian Hill, off Pasir Panjang Road, on Singapore's southern coast. Facing the hilltop is Bukit Chandu ('Opium Hill' in Malay), where the British East India Company had an opium factory to process raw opium from the Golden Triangle for sale to China and South East Asia in the 19th century. To protect its military facilities in the vicinity, the British colonial government placed heavy artillery guns on Chwee Chian Hill before the onset of the Second World War, in anticipation of seaborne attacks by the Japanese off the coast of Pasir Panjang.

During the Battle of Pasir Panjang, Bukit Chandu was the last bastion of the 1st and 2nd Battalion Malay Regiment who, together with the 2nd Loyals Regiment, defended the western and southern parts of Singapore from 8–14 February 1942. Despite running low on ammunition and food, the Malay Regiments put up strong resistance, inflicting a heavy toll on the Japanese invaders. Outnumbered, the defenders were finally overrun and massacred by reinforced Japanese forces. A Malay officer, Second Lieutenant Adnan Bin Saidi, was captured alive and tortured by the Japanese, before being executed. The story of his heroism became well known throughout Singapore.

=== Founder Lee Choon Seng ===
Based on the concept of liberating the spirits of the soldiers and civilians who were sacrificed during the Japanese invasion in World War II, the temple of Poh Ern Shih was constructed on the site of the bloodshed on Chwee Chian Hill. It was established in 1954 as a modest single storey temple by philanthropist Lee Choon Seng (1888—1966), as one of the few Chinese Mahayana temples in Singapore dedicated to the Ksitigarbha Bodhisattva.

Lee was born in Yong Choon county, Fujian province, in China. He joined his father in Negri Sembilan in his youth, before moving to Singapore to set up his own property business. He was very successful, and achieved positions of leadership in the local Chinese community. He was widely known as one of the co-founders of the Oversea-Chinese Banking Corporation (OCBC), and was its acting chairman during the Japanese Occupation. As one of the early Buddhist pioneers, Lee was also involved in the foundation of the Buddhist Publications Circulation Centre in 1933, and the Singapore Buddhist Lodge in 1934.

=== First Western abbot ===
Venerable Sumangalo (1903—1963) was born as Robert Stuart Clifton in a devout Christian family in Birmingham, Alabama in the United States in 1903. After receiving his Doctorate in Literature, he lectured on Buddhism in the United States before moving to Asia to further his study of Buddhism. In 1957, he joined the Theravada Order in Laos and received the monastic name Sumangalo, meaning "very auspicious". He then left for Malaya and later visited Singapore on a spiritual tour in late 1959 with another American Buddhist monk, Venerable Susiddhi. Through his efforts, a number of Youth Circles and Sunday schools were set up locally.

In January 1959, he was invited to be the honorary abbot of Poh Ern Shih, thus becoming the first Westerner to be the abbot of a Buddhist temple in Singapore. While in Singapore, he assisted Pitt Chin Hui in her translation of the Ksitigarbha Bodhisattva Sutra from Chinese to English. He returned to Malaya and spent his later years at Penang Buddhist Association, where most of his Dhamma lectures were held. His lectures were later compiled in English and Chinese and are still freely distributed. Venerable Sumangalo died on 6 February 1963 and was cremated in Penang.

=== Female Buddhist pioneer ===
Pitt Chin Hui (1906—1981) was born to a wealthy family in Guangzhou, China. She was the youngest child of the family, and was taken by her mother to Penang to receive her early education. In 1924, she sat for the Senior Cambridge Examination, and while waiting for the examination results she became an English teacher at the Fujian Girls' School. In 1927, she left for further studies at the Zhongshan University in Guangzhou. However, she terminated her tertiary studies and returned to Penang when her mother became seriously ill. While in Penang, she attended Dharma lectures by Venerable Taixu and his disciple, Venerable Cihang, at the Kek Lok Si Temple. Pitt subsequently became one of Cihang's disciples, and studied under him. She was responsible for setting up the Maha Bodhi School in Penang and Singapore (1946), to promote Buddhist education to the young. Along with her school duties, Pitt was also an active voluntary worker in the Buddhist community.

In December 1959, Pitt embarked on the task of translating the Ksitigarbha Bodhisattva Sutra from Chinese to English at Poh Ern Shih, so that it would be accessible to the English-educated. Venerable Sumangalo assisted Pitt in her translation tasks, as well as offering suggestions for improving the English version. In 1964, Pitt was awarded the Public Service Star—BBM (Bintang Bakti Masharakat)—by Encik Yusof bin Ishak, the First President of the Republic of Singapore. In 1973, she was appointed as Justice of the Peace by the Second President Dr. Benjamin Henry Sheares. Pitt Chin Hui was also a Vice-President of the World Fellowship of Buddhists. She died in 1981 while on a trip in India.

== Building design ==
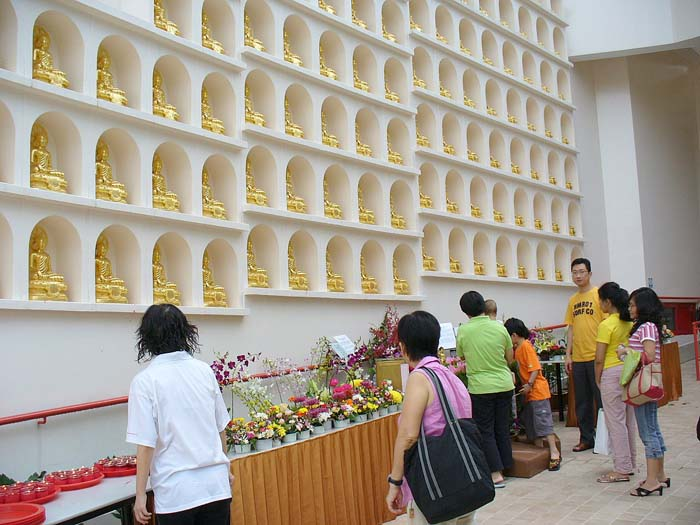
Devotees celebrating Vesak at the Wall of the Golden Buddhas of Poh Ern Shih

To allow for expansion, the old premises were demolished. Reconstruction began in 2003, and the office wing was completed in April 2007, in phase 1 of the project. The new six-storey building was designed by Lee Coo, who is also the architect behind the Venerable Hong Choon Memorial Hall of the Kong Meng San Phor Kark See Temple. Occupying a 46,938-square-foot (4,360.7 m^{2}) freehold site, the new Poh Ern Shih is an architectural synthesis of classical features combined with modern eco-friendly technology.

=== Civic consciousness ===
Conscious that a large percentage of its devotees were in their 60s, the Honorary President/Director of Poh Ern Shih, Lee Boon Siong, a retired lawyer, grandson of the temple's founder, and its chief architect, strove to ensure that the temple was accessible to the elderly and those who use wheelchairs. A gentle driveway stretches from the gates to the upper levels of the temple, and every storey of the building has level flooring. The lavatory cubicles are fitted with easily reached "call-for-help" buttons, and the doors are designed so that they can be unlocked from the outside in the case of emergency.

=== Eco-friendly features ===
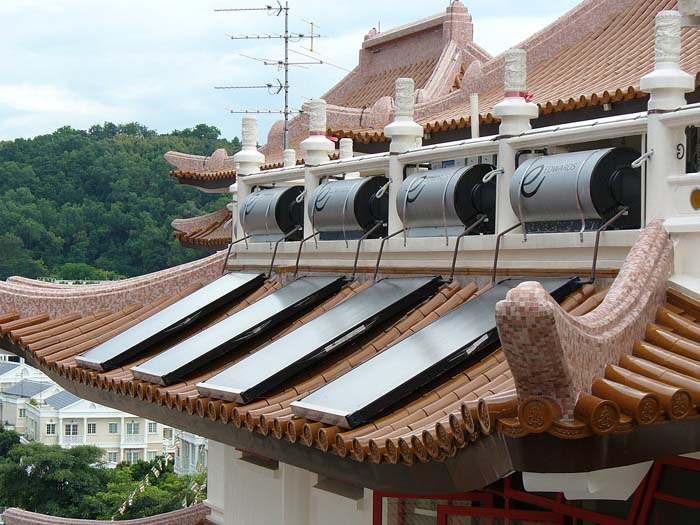
Solar panels installed at the rooftops of the temple as part of its eco-friendly design

The temple takes advantage of Singapore's abundant sunlight by having three different kinds of solar energy cells on its rooftop. They are the poly-crystalline silicon solar array, mono-crystalline silicon solar array and amorphous silicon solar array. Poh Ern Shih's water is heated by its solar panels, and its night lighting is powered by electricity converted from solar energy, With its breezy location, wind generators have also been erected to convert wind activity into electricity.

The rainwater which falls on Poh Ern Shih is collected from surface run-offs and rain gutters and used to irrigate the temple grounds, as well as to generate electricity used for charging the batteries of in-house motorised wheelchairs. The electricity is produced by water from the highest floor of the temple passing through hydroelectric-generators. A purification system is also being installed, so that the collected rainwater can be filtered and made potable.

In line with the aim to make use of renewable resources, the furniture in Poh Ern Shih for its resident monastics is made from bamboo. Bamboo is considered to one of the most ecologically friendly materials for use in home furnishing and flooring, because it can be harvested without felling the entire tree. There is therefore no need for replanting, and the bamboo is allowed to regain its full height again over about five years, ready to be harvested again.

The second phase of the temple was completed in late 2008, featuring a new Main Ksitigarbha Prayer Hall as well as a Guanyin Meditation Hall with lapis lazuli statues and a 7-storey stupa.

== The temple today ==
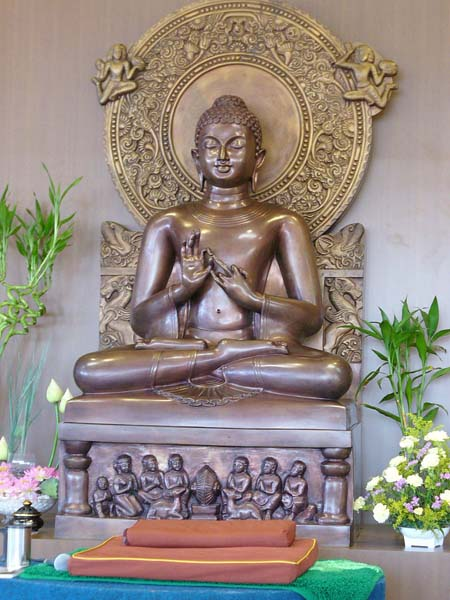
Replica of the Sarnath Buddha, depicting the Buddha giving the First Discourse. The image was cast in Thailand and is now in the Dharma Hall of the Buddhist Fellowship at Poh Ern Shih

To reinvigorate itself and attract younger blood, Poh Ern Shih entered into a partnership with the Buddhist Fellowship , a non-sectarian Buddhist organisation known locally for its revolutionary projects and activities intended to ensure that the Dharma is propagated in contemporary language and form. The Fellowship—whose more than 2,000 members are mainly English-speaking professionals, mostly under 45 years of age—initially rented space at Eton House in Paya Lebar. Lee Boon Siong contacted the Fellowship's President, Angie Monksfield, a Chinese Singaporean married to an English Catholic, offering use of the temple premises. In early 2007, Angie took up the offer after the rent for Eton House was raised by 57 per cent—a sum which was difficult for the fellowship to afford. The rent charged by the temple is the same as that which the Fellowship was paying before the increase demanded by its previous landlord.

The Fellowship moved into its 4,000 square feet (370 m^{2}) of space in Poh Ern Shih on 29 May 2007. The event was marked by an opening ceremony attended by Khaw Boon Wan, Minister for Health, and the Fellowship's two spiritual patrons, Ajahn Brahm and Venerable Kwang Sheng, Abbot of Kong Meng San Phor Kark See Temple. The group conducts programmes such as Dharma talks, Sutta discussions and meditation courses led by visiting Sangha and notable lay Buddhist teachers such as Piya Tan, Dr. Ang Beng Choo and Prof. Tan Hun Tong and many more. The temple is open to the public daily, and admission is free.

== See also ==
- Sumangalo
- Lee Choon Seng
- Buddhism in Singapore

== Bibliography ==
- Koh, c-u Pinn (2007). "Renewing the Temple of Thanksgiving"—Vaidurya (May/Jun 2007). Singapore: Golden Pagoda Buddhist Temple.
- Piyasilo (1992h). Charisma in Buddhism. Malaysia: Dharmafarers Enterprises. ISBN 983-9030-10-8.
- Piyasilo (1992). New Directions in Buddhism Today. Malaysia: Dharmafarers Enterprises. ISBN 983-9030-03-5.
- Ong, Y.D. (2005). Buddhism in Singapore—A Short Narrative History. Singapore: Skylark Publications. ISBN 981-05-2740-3.
- Venerable Sumangalo (2006). Lectures by Venerable Sumangalo Bhikkhu (in Chinese). Malaysia: Penang Buddhist Association (Free distribution).
