= Clement Everitt =

Singapore lawyer (1873–1934)

Sir Clement Everitt (22 December 1873 – February 1934) was a lawyer and member of the Legislative Council of the Straits Settlements. Everitt arrived in Singapore in 1905, where he remained for 22 years before retiring in November 1927.

== Early life ==
Everitt was born in Wells, Norfolk, on 22 December 1873. He attended Malvern College. He passed his solicitors' final examination with honours in January 1898.

== Career ==
He arrived in Singapore in 1905 and joined the legal firm of Sisson and Delay as an assistant. In the same year, he was admitted to the Bar of the Straits Settlements. Following the retirement of James Arthur Delay in 1909, he became a partner of the firm. As a lawyer, he defended Syed Mohamed bin Agil, who was accused of murdering a member of the Alsagoff family. He was a member of the Singapore Bar Committee, and served as the committee's chairman for several years.

In April 1922, he was appointed an unofficial member of the Legislative Council of the Straits Settlements. In 1925, he was temporarily appointed an acting unofficial member of the Executive Council of the Straits Settlements, replacing Maurice John Upcott. Upon Upcott's death in August, he was confirmed in his office. At the time of his retirement, he was the first and only person to have simultaneously served as an unofficial member of both councils.

He served as the legal advisor to both the Imperial Merchant Service Guild and the Straits Settlements Merchant Service Guild. He was a member of the Statute Law Revision Committee, which was largely responsible for the revision of the laws of the colony in 1920. He was also a director on the boards of several public companies. He commanded the Veteran Company of the Singapore Volunteer Corps in World War I. For his service in the war, he was personally thanked by the governor of the Straits Settlements. He served as a Visitor to the Lunatic Asylum for around fifteen years. He also advocated for the construction of a mental hospital, which, at the time of his retirement, was in the process of being constructed. He was a member and one-time president of the Singapore branch of the Straits Settlements Association. He received a knighthood in 1928.

== Personal life and death ==
Everitt married Elsie May Coxeter in July 1912, and together they had a son. Everitt was a hockey, soccer, tennis and golf player. He was a member of the Singapore Golf Club and the president of the Singapore St. George's Society. He was also an amateur actor. In 1906, he became a founding member of the Singapore Amateur Dramatic Committee. In the same year, he made his debut in the first play staged by the committee, Dream Faces, a one-act comedy. Everitt retired in 1927, and left Singapore on the Macedonia on 18 November.

Everitt died in February 1934. Everitt Road was named after him.
