= Wong Yip Yan =

Singaporean Chinese businessman

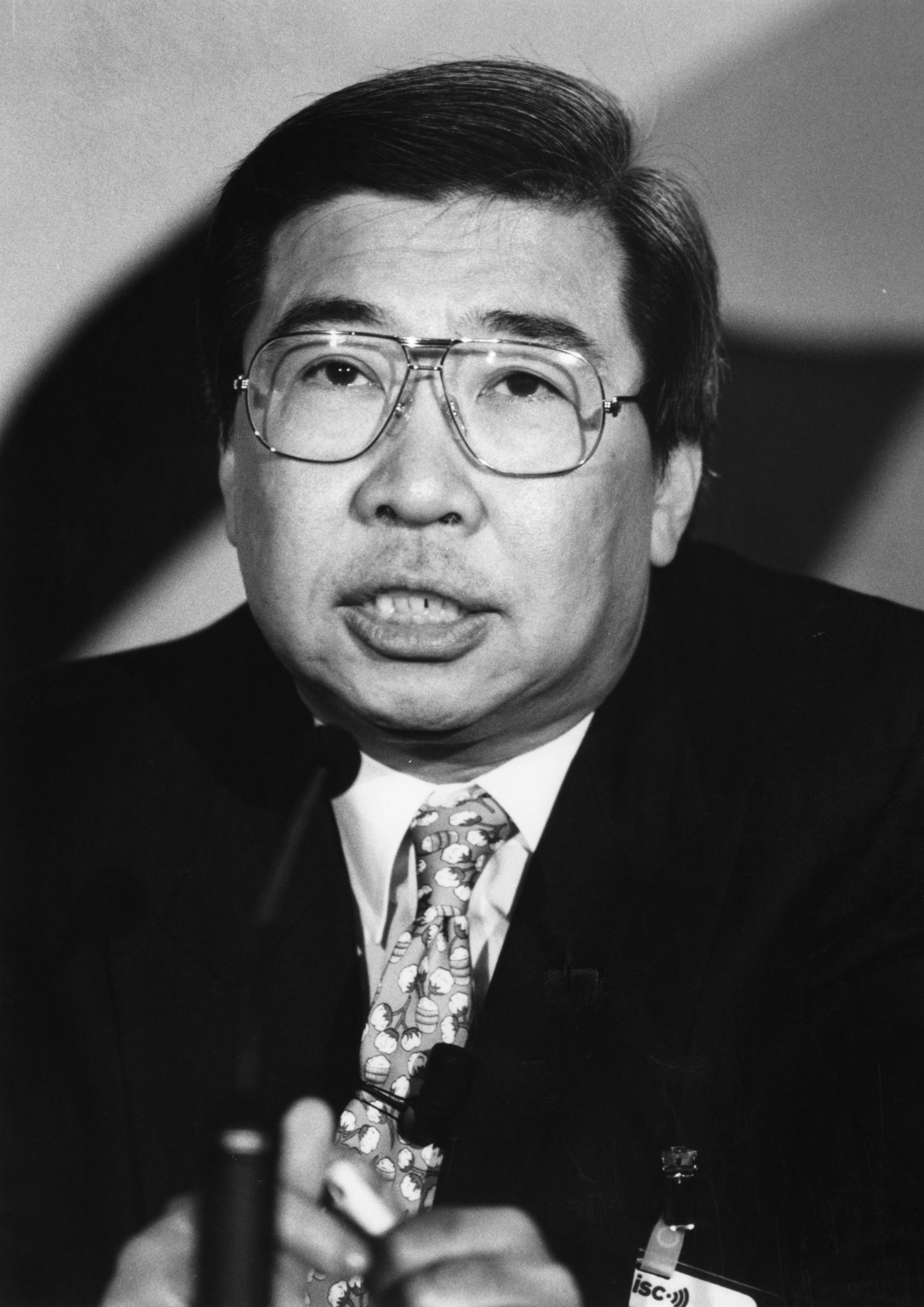
- Born: 1946 (age 79–80)
- Other names: Y.Y. Wong
- Citizenship: Singapore
- Organization: Wywy Group of Companies
- Spouse: Geok Choo

Wong Yip Yan (Chinese: 黄业仁; pinyin: Wáng Yèren), also known as Y.Y. Wong, is a Singaporean Chinese businessman, and founder of the Wywy Group of Companies. According to Businessweek, the Wywy Group controlled 76 companies and had annual sales of over $900 million.

== Career ==
When Wong was 26, he became the first Singaporean director at Borneo Company Limited, a British trading company. Wong said his boss told him that a Chinese couldn't get promoted to the company's main board of directors, causing Wong to start his own business.

To start the Wywy Group, Wong got funding from executives of Fujifilm, who had worked with Wong at Borneo. They helped him get a credit line of $178,000 from The Bank of Tokyo-Mitsubishi UFJ, which allowed him to start the Wywy Group as a distributor of copy machines.

Wong was the chairman of Yeo Hiap Seng, Singapore's largest drink manufacturer.

== Family ==
Wong is married and has three grown children. Wong's oldest son, Dr. Wong Meng Ee, contracted retinitis pigmentosa when he was 11 years old. The condition resulted in permanent blindness. Dr. Wong Meng Ee is currently the president of the Retinitis Pigmentosa Society Singapore.

Wong is the brother of Wong Yip Chong and uncle of Wong Meng Cheong. Meng Cheong is a prominent Singaporean physician who famously took his father's mistress to court over his $7 million house after his death. He ultimately lost his case against his father's mistress.

== Education ==
Wong is an alumnus of the Harvard Business School.
