= Teresa Hsu =

Singaporean charity worker, social worker, yoga teacher and nurse (1898–2011)

Teresa Hsu 許哲
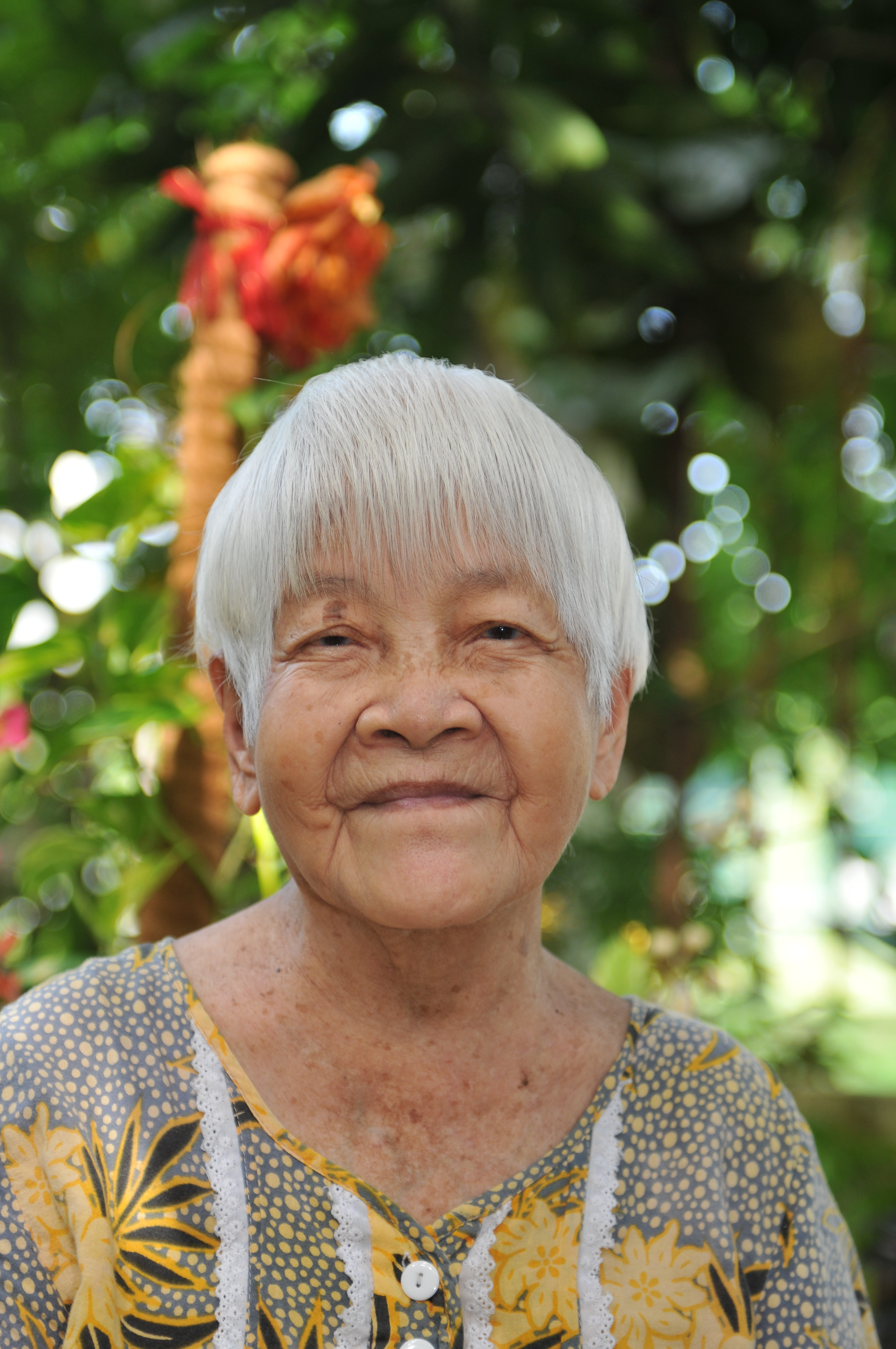
- Born: 7 July 1898; Shantou, Qing China
- Died: 7 December 2011 (aged 113 years, 153 days); Singapore
- Education: Honorary Doctorate Degree, University of Southern Queensland
- Occupations: Charity worker, social worker, yoga teacher, nurse
- Website: hearttoheartservice.org

Teresa Hsu Chih (7 July 1898 – 7 December 2011) (Chinese: 许哲; pinyin: Xǔ Zhe), was a Chinese-born Singaporean charity worker, social worker, yoga teacher, nurse, and supercentenarian known affectionately as "Singapore's Mother Teresa", in recognition for her active lifelong devotion in helping the aged, sick, and destitutes locally. The retired nurse was the founder of the non-profit charities—Heart to Heart Service and the Home for the Aged Sick, one of the first homes for the aged sick in Singapore. She had been a social worker in China and Paraguay and a nurse in England, before coming to Singapore to start similar non-profit charities since 1961. Despite being a supercentenarian, Hsu was still involved in charity work and was one of very few supercentenarians who were recognised for reasons other than their longevity. She had spent almost all her savings on feeding and housing the poor and the elderly, all of whom were younger than she was, while she herself led a simple and humble lifestyle. In 2005, she received the Special Recognition Award from the Singapore government in recognition of her contribution to the country.

== Early years ==
Hsu was reportedly born on 7 July 1898, in the Shantou prefecture of China, during the reign of the Manchu Qing dynasty, although this has never been independently verified. When Hsu was young, her father walked out on the family for another woman. Her mother, who was illiterate, had to fend for her three daughters and one brother singlehandedly. At 16, her family moved to Penang in Malaya, where they worked as cleaners in a convent. As she did not want to be a cleaner all her life, Hsu asked the nuns there to allow her to study with the children, and they agreed. Combining study with work, she passed her Senior Cambridge examinations four years later. Equipped with a basic education, she ventured to Hong Kong to work and, later, to Chongqing, China, where she became a secretary and bookkeeper at a German news agency in the 1930s. She quit her job to become a volunteer, helping the injured during the Sino-Japanese War.

Recalling her inability to help the wounded people whom she saw during the Second World War, Hsu decided to become a nurse. As she was overaged at 47, she wrote a request to the chief matron of the Nursing Council in London. Touched by Hsu's sincerity and dedication, her application was accepted. She spent eight years in England doing nursing and another eight in Paraguay as a member of the German charity group Bruderhof, to start hospitals and homes for the aged there. In her mid-50s, she decided to return home to Penang to be with her mother. In Malaysia, she assisted her brother in starting the Assunta Foundation for the Poor in Ipoh. She also played a key role in the startup of three homes for the elderly and two homes for young girls and neglected children in Ipoh.

== Home for the Aged Sick ==
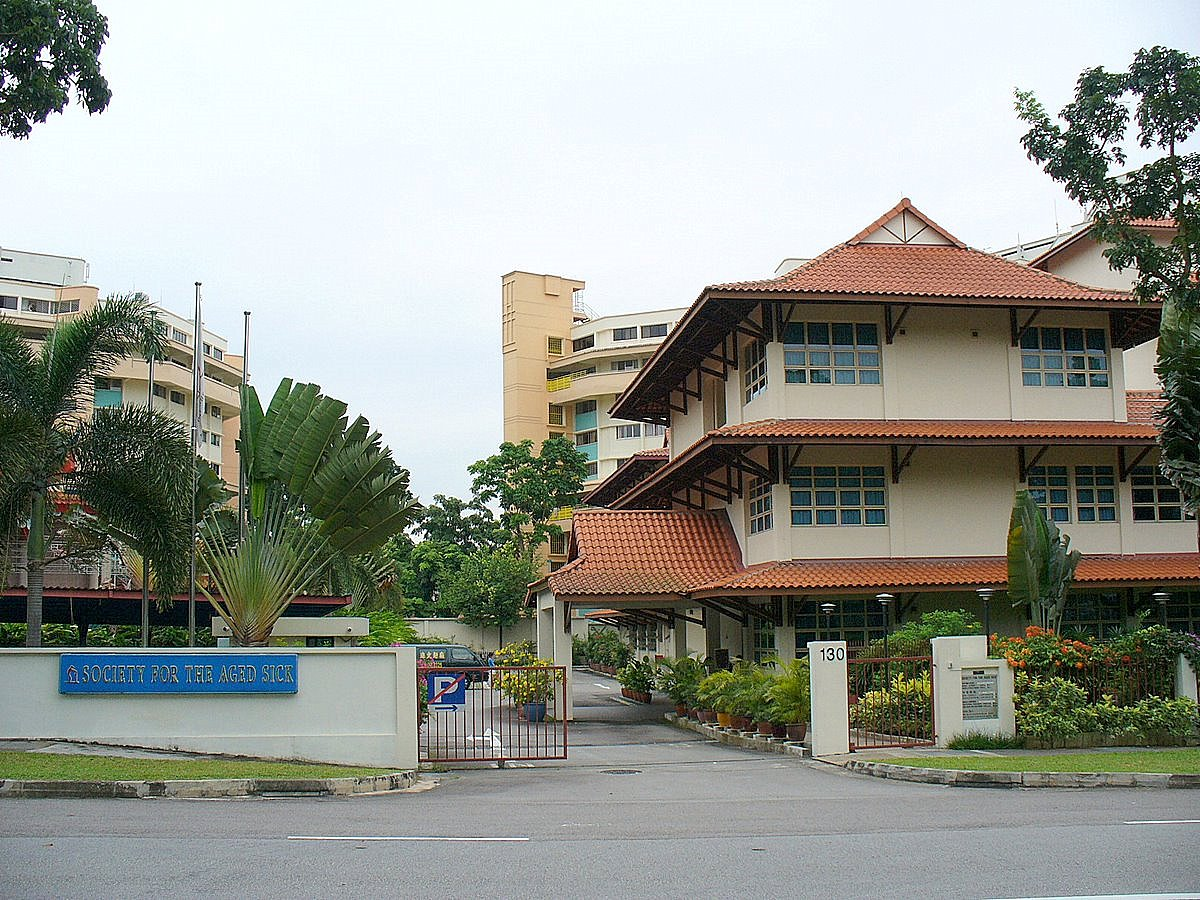
The Society for the Aged Sick at Hougang Avenue 1, Singapore

In 1961, she came to Singapore to live with her older sister, Ursula, late principal of the Convent of the Holy Infant Jesus in Bukit Timah. On seeing her dedication and commitment in helping the poor and sick, Ursula bought her a 0.6-hectare piece of land at Jalan Payoh Lai in 1965, so that Hsu could open the first home for the aged sick in Singapore. The two sisters ran the Home for the Aged Sick for five years. Ursula financed its operations with her pay, while Hsu managed it and made some extra cash by selling the harvest of 10 coconut trees and a dozen banana trees in the backyard.

The sisters converted a servants' quarters and a bungalow into wards for their patients, but it became increasingly difficult to cope with the numbers. In 1970, with about 100 patients, they approached the Rotary Club for funds. The Rotary Club agreed to finance the home on condition that the club take over the running of it. The sisters handed the deeds over to the Society for the Aged Sick, an association formed by the Rotary Club members. The society built three blocks to house the increasing number of residents and Hsu remained the home's matron until 1980, when she was asked to retire at 83. Hsu moved into a three-room apartment on the rooftop of the Home, built by the society. After her sister died, she left Hsu a sum of money which she was able to buy flats with—five in Singapore and two in Malaysia for those people who had no money and who were asked to move. When asked where all her compassion and deep caring came from, she replied:

I must have got it from my mother because she was totally dedicated to the job she chose to do and that was looking after the family. I think that trait was passed down to us. I've no family, so I look after everybody else. I choose to serve everybody else who comes to me—that is my job... The world is my home, all living beings are my family, selfless service is my religion.

== Heart to Heart ==
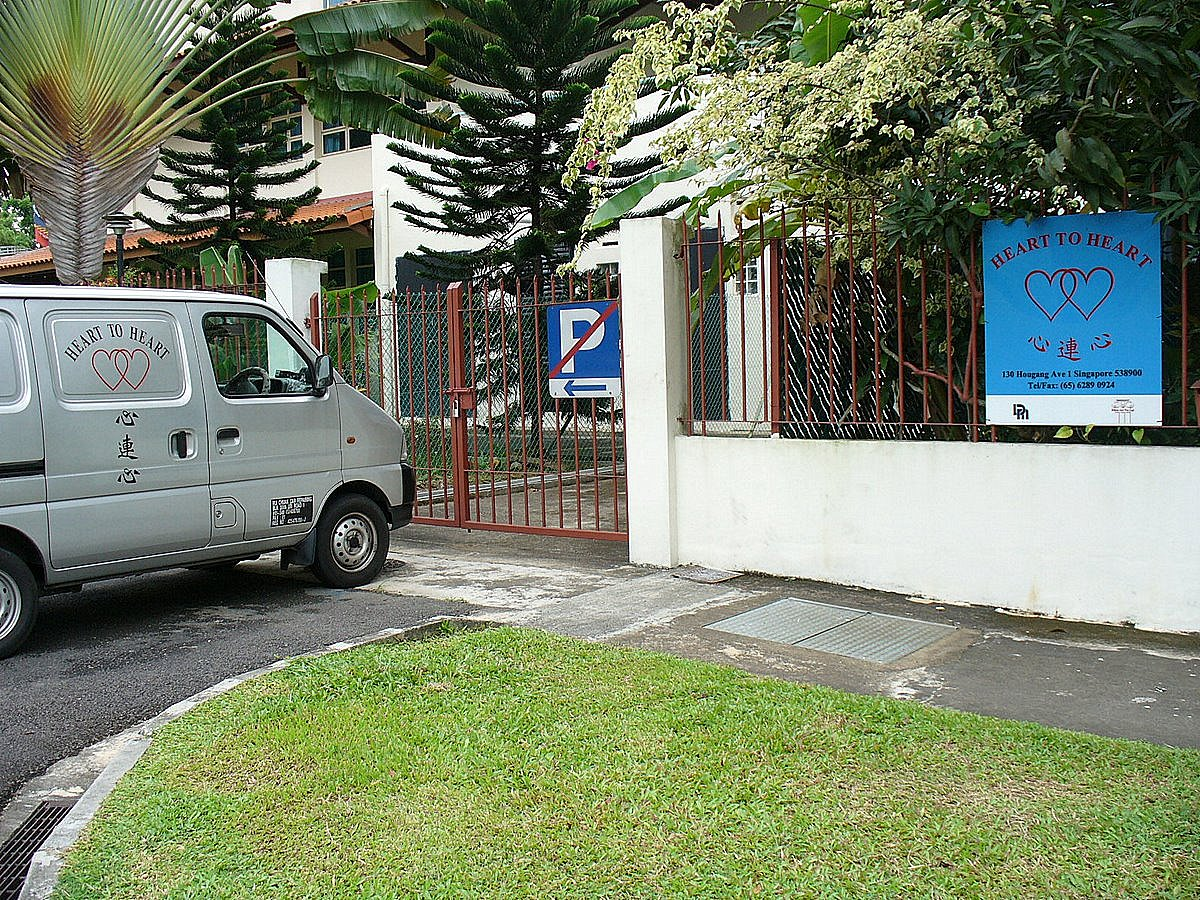
The Heart to Heart Service Centre is located at the premises of the Society for the Aged Sick in Hougang, Singapore

Shortly after she retired, Hsu set up the Heart to Heart Service with Sharana Yao, her co-social worker, a non-profit, non-government aided welfare service which provides food, clothes and monthly cash contributions to those in need. With the help of volunteers who drove her around, she brought necessities to the homes of elderly women and destitutes in their 80s and 90s on public assistance, such as rice, sugar, biscuits, beverages and monthly cash allowances of between S$20 and S$180. She got her rations and funds from various sources—merchants, people in the neighbourhood, church friends, and their friends. The needy get on Heart-to-Heart's list based on good faith by word of mouth. In 2000, a Straits Times reader wrote to comment on her selfless contributions to the society and urged the young to follow her example:

As we admire the grit, good humour and faith that Ms Hsu has, might we also ponder over a certain dilemma: Where are the Teresa Hsus of today? Ms Hsu is at an age where most would have long retired, but she takes it upon herself to be of service to others, to those who are less fortunate than her. A society like Singapore requires a lot more individuals like this and we need them now... We need to have more youths as volunteers or pursuing a career in social work as they will be the core of our society... More publicity and attention must be drawn to volunteer opportunities and more must be done to recognise dedicated people like Ms Hsu. We cannot continue in our efforts of building a gracious society without strengthening volunteerism as a culture. There is little to be gained by being more cultured if we do not take the plight of the less fortunate into consideration.

== Lifestyle ==
Hsu was still actively involved in charity work after turning 110. An advocate of healthy living, Hsu often gave public talks at schools, welfare homes, and hospitals in Singapore and overseas about health and service to the needy. When asked about the secret of her good health and longevity, Hsu attributed her good health to a spartan lifestyle, vegetarian diet, and to her positive attitude towards life.

I prefer to laugh than to weep. Those people who cry to me, I always tell them it is better to laugh than to use tissue paper, as laughing is free but tissue paper still cost five-cent. 'Ha ha ha' cost no cents.

She would start her day at 4 am with calisthenics, meditation and an hour of yoga exercises. At night, she would do yoga again, then read until midnight. She picked up yoga at age 69, when she bought a book titled Forever Young, Forever Healthy. She also taught yoga to the young and old at temples, associations, hospitals and schools. She ate sparely; her breakfast was a glass of water or milk. Lunch was often milk and salad, unless "people bring me food", and it was milk or yogurt for dinner. At home, she had a 2,000-volume private library she called Prema, which in Sanskrit means "divine love". Her final days were kept busy with trips to help needy senior citizens, reading and yoga practice at her sparsely-furnished single-storey house attached to the Society for the Aged Sick.

=== Vegetarianism ===
Hsu was vegetarian since birth as she wasn’t able to digest meat. In the 1950's she became an ethical vegetarian.

I have been allergic to non-veg food since birth. I became a conscious vegetarian one day during the 1950s, when I was sitting by a river and saw the fish playing happily with each other. I thought to myself that we humans have no right to end their fun, put a knife in their throats, and cause them great pain for our pleasure.

She stated that her vegetarian diet consisted of raw vegetables, avocado, juice, milk, beans and raw eggs. Hsu ate one raw egg everyday for breakfast. In her last 13 years, she was given vegetarian food including fresh organic vegetables every week by her helpers.

== Death ==
Hsu died at home on 7 December 2011 and was cremated on the same day without any rites, per her instructions. She was believed to be the oldest living person in Singapore at the time of her death, although later that year Fadilah Noor Abbe was reported to have been born in 1897.

== Commendation ==
- 2009 aged 111: Public Service Star
- 2006 aged 108: Received the National Volunteer and Philanthropy Centre's Special Recognition Award from Deputy Prime Minister S. Jayakumar.
- 2005 aged 107: A photography exhibition was held to honour Hsu's life and work at the Mica Building, from 6 July 'til 18 July, titled OneZeroSeven Photography Exhibition: Teresa Hsu Chih.
- 2004 aged 106: Received the Sporting Singapore Inspiration Award from Dr Vivian Balakrishnan, Acting Minister for Community Development, Youth and Sports, for her devotion to the teaching of yoga.
- 2003 aged 105: Honorary doctorate degree conferred by the University of Southern Queensland, Australia.
- 2003 aged 105: Received the Active Senior Citizen of the Year Award from Chan Soo Sen, Minister of State (Education, Community Development and Sports).
- 2002 aged 104: Received an honorary doctorate from the University of Southern Queensland, Australia.
- 1999 aged 101: Received a one-off Special Award at the Woman of the Year 1999 awards ceremony at the Raffles Hotel organised by Her World magazine.
- 1997 aged 99: Named 'Hero for Today' by the Chinese-edition of the Reader's Digest.
- 1994 aged 96: Received the Community Service Award awarded by the Life Insurance Association for her contribution to community service.
- 1988 aged 90: Guinness Stout Effort Award.

== See also ==
- Venerable Jing Run
- Lee Choon Seng
- Lee Kong Chian
- Gan Eng Seng
