= Lee Choon Seng =

Chinese businessman and philanthropist

Portrait of Lee Choon Seng, c. 1936

Lee Choon Seng (Chinese: 李俊承; pinyin: Lǐ Jùnchéng; Pe̍h-ōe-jī: Lí Tsùn-sîng; 1888—5 June 1966) was a businessman and philanthropist in pre-independence Singapore. He founded several companies, cultivated rubber plantations in Malaya and started Chinese banks in the region. Lee held leadership roles in several Chinese community organisations in Singapore, notably the Singapore Chinese Chamber of Commerce and Industry (SCCCI), and supported Sun Yat-Sen's revolutionary cause in China. In addition, he promoted the growth of Buddhism in Singapore by setting up several Buddhist institutions, including the Singapore Buddhist Lodge, Singapore Buddhist Federation and Poh Ern Shih Temple.

In 2008, his life and contributions to society were commemorated in a memorial hall at the Ee Hoe Hean Club.

== Early years and personal life ==
In 1888, Lee was born in Yongchun County, Fujian, China; he had an elder stepbrother and a younger sister. To seek better fortunes, his father, Lee Lip Chai (Chinese: 李立齋; pinyin: Li Lìzhāi; Pe̍h-ōe-jī: Lí Li̍p-chai), emigrated to Negri Sembilan, Malaysia, where he started a horse-drawn transport service and a provision shop, then initiated a series of charitable projects, including setting up a clan association and schools. Lee later joined his father in Negri Sembilan to help him run the family business and participate in his charitable projects. Lee grew up as a Taoist, but converted to Buddhism in adulthood, with Venerable Hong Choon, the abbot of Kong Meng San Temple, acting as his spiritual mentor. He married twice and had at least fifteen children.

== Business ==
Lee moved to Singapore to set up another branch of his family business, called Thye Hin Limited. In Singapore, he founded Eng Hin Company, the Thye Hong Biscuit Factory and Thye Ann Investment, a property firm. He also cultivated large rubber plantations across Malaya. Realising that many newly arrived businessmen had difficulty obtaining loans from established Western banks, Lee and his business associates started several local Chinese banks, including Ho Hong Bank. In 1931, Lee became the managing director of Ho Hong Bank and after it merged with two other banks to form the Oversea-Chinese Banking Corporation (OCBC), he became a director of OCBC and eventually its chairman.

== Contributions to the Chinese community ==
=== Support of Sun Yat Sen ===
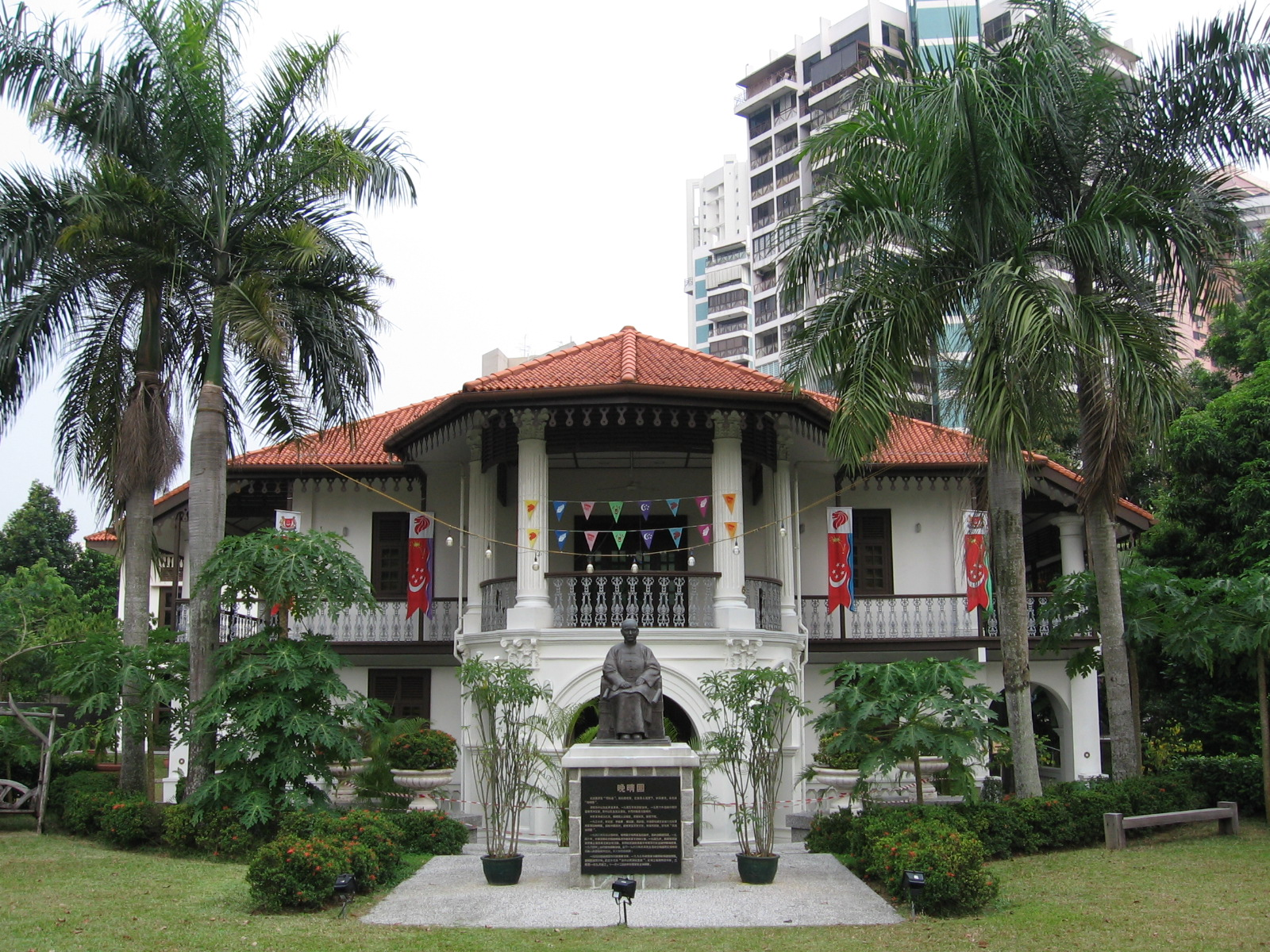
The Sun Yat Sen Nanyang Memorial Hall, formerly known as Wan Qing Yuan, at Tai Gin Road, Singapore

An ardent supporter of the Kuomintang, Lee was involved in secret meetings with Sun Yat-Sen at the Wan Qing Yuan, a two-storey villa at Tai Gin Road. He also helped the Chinese diaspora in Southeast Asia raise funds to support the Kuomintang. In 1937, Lee and five other Chinese community leaders bought the Wan Qing Yuan to preserve it as a historical site; it was later handed over to the Singapore Chinese Chamber of Commerce and Industry (SCCCI), which renovated it and turned it into a national monument, the Sun Yat Sen Villa (now Sun Yat Sen Nanyang Memorial Hall).

=== Chinese community organisations ===
From 1927, Lee was actively involved with the SCCCI, initially as General-Secretary, then as President. Under his leadership, the SCCCI supported the establishment of Nanyang University and convinced the British to grant citizenship to Chinese immigrants who had lived in Singapore for eight years. Lee was Chairman of the Ee Hoe Hean Club from 1933 to 1935 and from 1941 to 1945. Lee was also one of six Hokkien representatives in the Overseas Chinese Association (OCA), which acted as a bridge between the Chinese community and Japanese military administration during the Japanese Occupation of Singapore. During an OCA assignment to the Endau Settlement in Malaysia, his convoy was ambushed by the Malayan People's Anti-Japanese Army and everyone in the convoy was shot. Only Lee survived, as a bullet hit a Buddhist medallion on his chest; this inspired him to spread Buddhism in Singapore.

== Contributions to Buddhism in Singapore ==
=== Poh Ern Shih Temple ===
During World War II, many Japanese soldiers, British soldiers and civilians died in the crossfire and bombings of the Battle of Pasir Panjang at Chwee Chian Hill. On advice from Venerable Hong Choon, Lee purchased the hill from the British colonial government, with the aim of building a Buddhist temple dedicated to the bodhisattva Ksitigarbha, to liberate the spirits of the people who were sacrificed during the Japanese invasion. In 1950, Lee incorporated the 46,938 square feet (4,360.7 m^{2}) Poh Ern Shih Temple (Hokkien for "temple of thanksgiving") as a limited company without shares, and in April 1954, he officiated its opening.

=== Singapore Buddhist Lodge ===
In 1943, the Singapore Buddhist Lodge was set up with about 100 members, mostly from the Chinese social elite. Its fixed address, a double-storey house at 26 Blair Road, was donated by Lee, who also contributed S$1,000 for furniture and other expenses, a considerable sum at that time. The Lodge grew to over 2000 members by 1946, so Zhang Jiamei and Zhong Tianshui decided to rent bigger premises at 17 Kim Yam Road. In 1950, Zhang and Lee donated S$10,000 and started a drive to raise funds to purchase the rented premises.

=== Singapore Buddhist Federation ===
The rate of growth of Buddhist temples and Buddhists doubled after the war, but without an umbrella organisation, each temple, headed by a chief monk or management committee, had its own way of conducting its affairs and relied on itself for financial support. Lee invited representatives from all Chinese temples to the Singapore Buddhist Lodge to discuss the formation of an umbrella organisation, and on 30 October 1949, the Singapore Buddhist Federation was registered, with Lee elected as its chairman and Venerable Hong Choon as its vice-chairman.

In its first decade, its notable achievements included having Vesak Day gazetted as a public holiday in 1955, getting government approval to set up a Buddhist cemetery of about 110 acres (0.45 km^{2}) at Choa Chu Kang Road and managing two schools, Maha Bodhi School and Mee Toh School.

=== The Chinese Temple in Sarnath ===
In the early 1930s, Lee learned that Venerable Tao Chiai wanted to restore a dilapidated Chinese temple in Sarnath (the deer park where the Buddha gave his first sermon after his enlightenment) that a Chinese emperor of the Tang dynasty built in the 8th century AD. Venerable Tao Chiai died before he could accomplish this task; however, his chief disciple, Venerable Teh Yue, continued the restoration project, which Lee personally funded. Lee went on a pilgrimage to India with Venerable Teh Yue and brought along an English engineer, A. H. King, to assess and assist the restoration works. This temple still stands today in Sarnath and is called simply The Chinese Temple in Sarnath.

== Death and commemoration ==
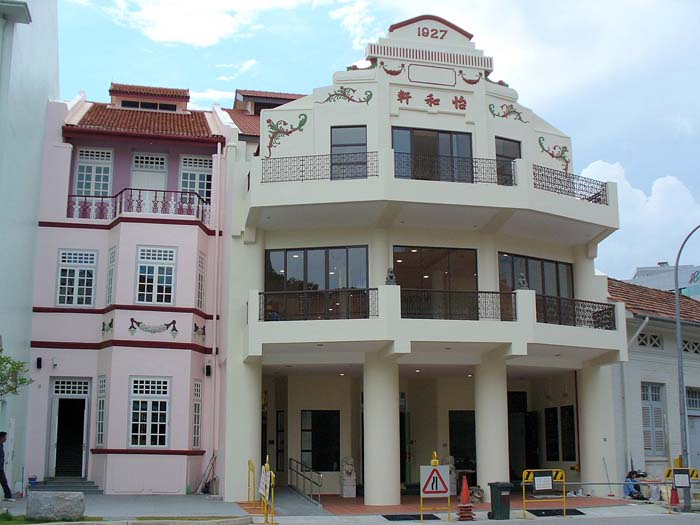
Lee's life and generosity to many charitable causes are being commemorated in a permanent gallery at the Ee Hoe Hean Club today

On 5 June 1966, Lee was found dead in his home at Pasir Panjang Road.

On 9 November 2008, his life and contributions to society were commemorated in a gallery, called The Pioneers' Memorial Hall, on the ground floor of the Ee Hoe Hean Club at Bukit Pasoh Road.

== See also ==
- Poh Ern Shih Temple
- Hong Choon
- Ho Yuen Hoe
- Teresa Hsu Chih
- Piya Tan
