= Ho Yuen Hoe =

Singaporean Buddhist nun

Venerable Ho Yuen Hoe 何润好 (净润法师)
- Born: 18 February 1908; Guangzhou, Guangdong Province, Qing Empire
- Died: 11 January 2006 (aged 97); Woodlands, Singapore
- Occupations: Bhikkhuni; Humanitarian
- Awards: Pingat Bakti Masyarakat (2004)

Ho Yuen Hoe (simplified Chinese: 何润好; traditional Chinese: 何潤好; pinyin: Hé Rùnhǎo; 18 February 1908 – 11 January 2006), later in life but rarely known by her Dharma name, Venerable Jing Run (simplified Chinese: 净润法师; traditional Chinese: 淨潤法師; pinyin: Jìngrùn Fǎshī), was a Buddhist nun affectionately known as Singapore's "grand dame of charity" in recognition of her lifelong devotion in helping the old and needy. She was the abbess of Lin Chee Cheng Sia Temple and the founder in 1969 of the Man Fut Tong Nursing Home, the first Buddhist nursing home. Venerable Ho was relatively unknown to the public until 1996, when she was featured in a television programme – The Extraordinary People – at the age of 88. As a result, the public became more familiar with her work and her nursing home. In 2001, she received the Public Service Award from the President of Singapore in recognition of her contribution to the country. Until her hospitalisation in November 2005 she was actively involved in charity work. Venerable Ho died on 11 January 2006, a month before what would have been her 98th birthday.

== Early life ==
Ho Yuen Hoe was born on 18 February 1908, to a family of silk weavers in Guangzhou, China, the second of three children. Her family was poor, and she was sold when she was five years old. Barely two years later, the spinster who had purchased her died, and Ho was sold by the woman's nephew, to become a maid. After a few years she was sold again. In her late teens, a group of snakeheads persuaded her and several other girls to emigrate to Singapore, ostensibly to work on a rubber plantation, but the job did not materialise. At the age of 21, alone and penniless, she married the owner of a grocery business. When the business failed, they left for Hong Kong, hoping for better fortune. Ho became a hairdresser in nearby Macau, but after discovering that her husband had another wife and children she decided to return to Singapore alone, vowing never to remarry. At about that same time, she became a vegetarian.

In 1936, with the help of a friend, the then 28-year-old Ho set up shop in Chinatown with only a comb, a stool, and a kerosene lamp. She worked from 8 am to 3 am, charging five cents to comb hair or weave plaits and buns for amahs and Samsui women. She did that every day for almost three decades, interrupted only by periods when she was incapacitated by acute attacks of arthritis. She scrimped and saved, and by the time she was in her 40s, she had enough to buy a shophouse in Club Street. Although illiterate, she made some property investments and eventually became a landlord, renting out rooms. As her wealth grew, she acquired more properties, and she began to adopt children from poor families, becoming a single mother of six daughters and twenty-five godchildren.

== Charity work ==
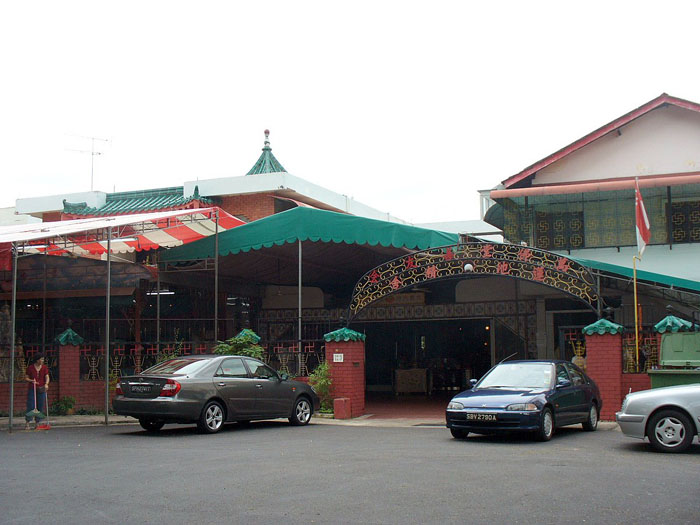
The Lin Chee Cheng Sia Temple at Richards Avenue was formerly the Man Fut Tong Old Peoples' Home from 1969 to 2000

A devout Buddhist from youth, once her children had grown up Ho decided to serve the Buddhist cause, and to dedicate the rest of her life to caring for others. In 1958, she became a Buddhist nun at the age of 50. In 1969, aged 61, Ho bought a two-storey detached house in Richards Avenue with her savings, and turned it into the Man Fut Tong Old Peoples' Home for aged sick and single elderly women. Most of the twenty or so residents had neither enough earnings to support themselves nor any relatives to turn to. To raise additional funds for the home, she cultivated and sold prize-winning white orchids at Tanglin, and vegetarian food at Kong Meng San Temple in Bishan. She cleaned, cooked, took her charges to the doctors, helped them to collect their social benefits and even sometimes saw to their last rites.

Venerable Ho's work was unknown to the public until 1996, when she was featured in a television programme – The Extraordinary People – at the age of 88. As a result, the public learned more about her and her nursing home. When asked why she had set up an old folks' home, Venerable Ho replied:

I used to feed the old folks at some of the homes, and it would sadden me to see them so yellow and sallow. One of them told me, they would go in 'vertical' and probably exit 'horizontal'. I might be illiterate but I wanted to give back to society. I didn't want to sit around and wait to die.

Inspired by Venerable Ho's devotion and compassion, volunteers and donations began to stream in, allowing the home to provide better medical care and facilities for its residents. Spurred on by the desire to do even more, she approached the government for a piece of land to expand her old folks' home. The Ministry of Health gave her a 5,000-square-metre (1.2-acre) plot in Woodlands, on which she oversaw the building of a new home. To help in raising funds for its construction, she published a recipe book called Top 100 Vegetarian Delights in 1998, which brought in more than S$100,000 (U$66,667). In August 2001, the new four-storey building was opened at Woodlands Street 82. It houses nearly 235 sick and elderly and provides residential, rehabilitation, and day-care services. The home is open to all regardless of age, gender, race or religion. It regularly organises in-house activities such as cooking, hand-craft, karaoke, and games, as well as visits to places of interest and participation in various community events. The original home is now a Buddhist temple, the Lin Chee Cheng Sia Temple.

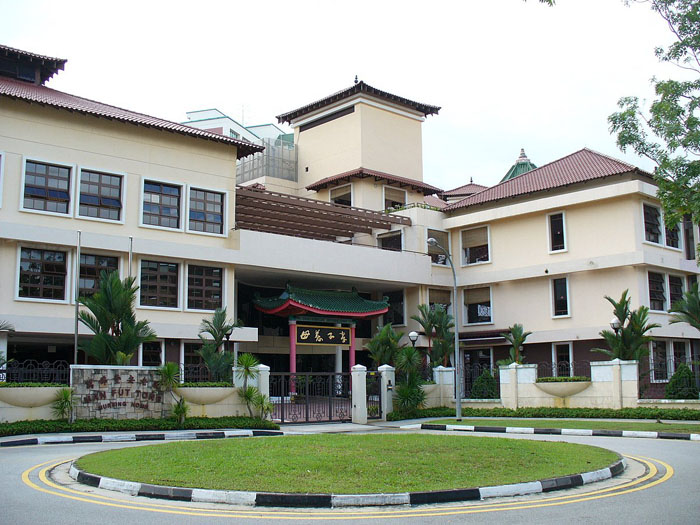
The Man Fut Tong Nursing Home at Woodlands Street 82, photographed September 2007

Despite her advancing age, Venerable Ho continued to raise funds to provide better medical care, and she set up committees to help organise Dharma classes for children and secure donations for various Buddhist causes. During an interview given to The Straits Times in 2004, she said: "Everything in life is transient. Only charity is real and enduring. When you give, you receive. Charity is the best antidote for bad karma."

She was not only successful in raising funds, but she also secured donations in kind and services. A Hindu charity, Shree Gniananda Seva Samajam donated S$75,000 to the Man Fut Tong Nursing Home in 2004, which was raised through ticket sales for a charity draw. On 11 February 2004, President S R Nathan, attended her birthday-cum-charity dinner and gave a speech in tribute of her contributions to the country:

This Man Fut Tong Nursing Home Charity Dinner event marks the 96th Lunar Birthday of Ven. Ho Yuen Hoe. More importantly, it reflects what Ven. Ho has done over many years to look after the needy sick and distressed elderly, irrespective of their race, language or religion. As we look back at what Ven. Ho has done for her cause over the years, she well deserves to be recognized as a formidable role model for both young and old Singaporeans ... My wife and I wish Ven. Ho a Very Happy Birthday – good health and happiness, and thank her for her valuable contributions to the community. We also wish the Man Fut Tong Nursing Home every success in serving the sick and needy elderly in Singapore.

== Death ==
On 11 January 2006, Venerable Ho died peacefully in her sleep at the Man Fut Tong Nursing Home, at about 9:30 pm, just one month before turning 98. Until being hospitalised in November 2005, she had cooked for and looked after herself and played an active role in running both the temple and the nursing home. During her hospital stay, she suffered a stroke, which affected her speech and paralysed the left side of her body. Discharged in December 2005, she was recuperating well at the nursing home until she developed a chest infection and breathing difficulties a few days before she died.

After her death, President S R Nathan sent a wreath of roses, chrysanthemums and orchids. Several government ministers attended her wake, including Senior Minister of State for Health Balaji Sadasivan, Minister of State for Community Development, Youth and Sports Yu-Foo Yee Shoon, Minister of State for Education and Trade and Industry Chan Soo Sen, and Northwest Community Development Council mayor Teo Ho Pin. Temple officials said she left instructions for S$100,000 to be distributed equally to 10 charities. She had purchased a simple coffin 10 years before her death, and she had also set aside S$10,000 to pay for her funeral.

On 22 January 2006, 20 chartered buses took more than 1,000 mourners – devotees, her godchildren, scores of wheelchair-using residents, representatives from various Buddhist temples, and well-wishers – to Tse Tho Aum Buddhist Temple in Sin Ming Drive for the final prayers and cremation. The abbess' ashes were kept for 100 days at her temple, before making their way to her final resting place in Zhejiang province in China, where her niece lives. As a follow-up to her funeral, her remains and personal items were put on one-day public display at her temple on 26 February 2006. The relics (Sariras) displayed were crystalline or pearl-like deposits found in Venerable Ho's ashes. Buddhists believe these are usually found in cremated Buddhist masters, are holy, and treat them with reverence.

Since Venerable Ho's death, her work at the temple and nursing home has been administered by Reverend Seck Cheng Charn and Reverend Tang Wai Sum respectively.

== Commemoration ==
An oil painting of Venerable Ho by Marcus Lim (Size: 100 cm x 75cm)

A pictorial book chronicling Venerable Ho's life, written in both English and Mandarin was launched at the Remembering Venerable Ho Charity Lunch held at the Meritus Mandarin Hotel on 28 January 2007. Called A Life For Others, the 138-page book was written by Dr Uma Rajan, the home's executive director. Five hundred hardcover copies of the book have been printed to raise funds for the Home, which costs S$4.5 million a year to run.

A bronze sculpture by sculptor Chern Lian Shan, and a portrait of Venerable Ho by artist Marcus Lim were also unveiled at the event, by President S. R. Nathan. Both the sculpture and the painting are now on display at the Woodlands home. A new hybrid orchid, created from the orchids Dendrobium 'Ekapol' and Dendrobium 'Lim Hepa', was also officially named 'Venerable Ho Yuen Hoe' and presented by Mrs. S. R. Nathan.

In 2001, Venerable Ho received the Public Service Medal from President S. R. Nathan at the Istana.

== See also ==
- Zhuan Dao
- Hong Choon
- Lee Choon Seng
- Cheng Yen
- Teresa Hsu Chih
