= David Apel =

Czech-Singaporean conductor and musician (1904–1967)

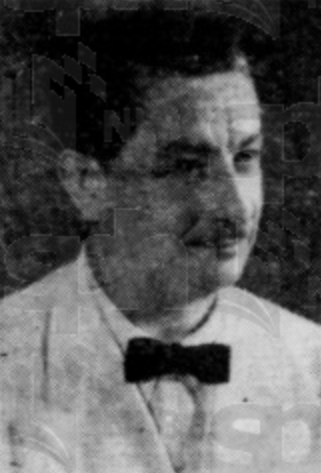
Apel in 1950

David Samuel Apelbaum (1904 – 16 September 1967), better known as David Apel, was a Czech-Singaporean pianist, accompanist, music teacher and conductor. Born in Austria-Hungary, he settled in Singapore and remained active there from the 1940s to his death in 1967.

== Early life and education ==
Apel was born in Vienna, Austria-Hungary in 1904. After receiving a formal education, he began attending the Prague Conservatory, where he studied under Conrad Ansorge and Alexander von Zemlinsky. The Straits Times reported that Apel took five years to complete his seven-year graduation course and then took the "Master's Course", which was "only for pupils with exceptional talent." He was also a "student-teacher". He graduated from the conservatory in 1933. While there, he formed an orchestra which specialised in film soundtracks, as well as broadcasting and recording. He also supported the Czechoslovak Scientific Anti-Tuberculosis Society.

== Career ==
Apel came to Malaya in 1939. He was first employed at the Royal Selangor Club in Kuala Lumpur. He then began working as a pianist at the Hotel Majestic, also in Kuala Lumpur. In March 1940, he served as the accompaniment to violinist E. Schoen at a recital of the Kuala Lumpur Musical Society, held at The Majestic. In this period, Apel also gave music lessons. He then came Singapore shortly before the Japanese Occupation, which began in February 1942. By September, The Syonan Times, which had taken the place of The Straits Times, reported that Apel had begun arranging music for the Syonan Symphony Orchestra, who performed weekly at the Victoria Theatre, then renamed the "Synonan Kokaido", and occasionally at the Cathay Cinema, which had been renamed the "Dai Toa Gekizyo". The Syonan Times, then renamed the Syonan Shimbun, reported that he was serving as the orchestra's pianist by April. By May, he had begun conducting for the orchestra. Eventually, he was interned with his wife for a few months. They were held at Changi Prison before being transferred to the Sime Road Internment Camp.

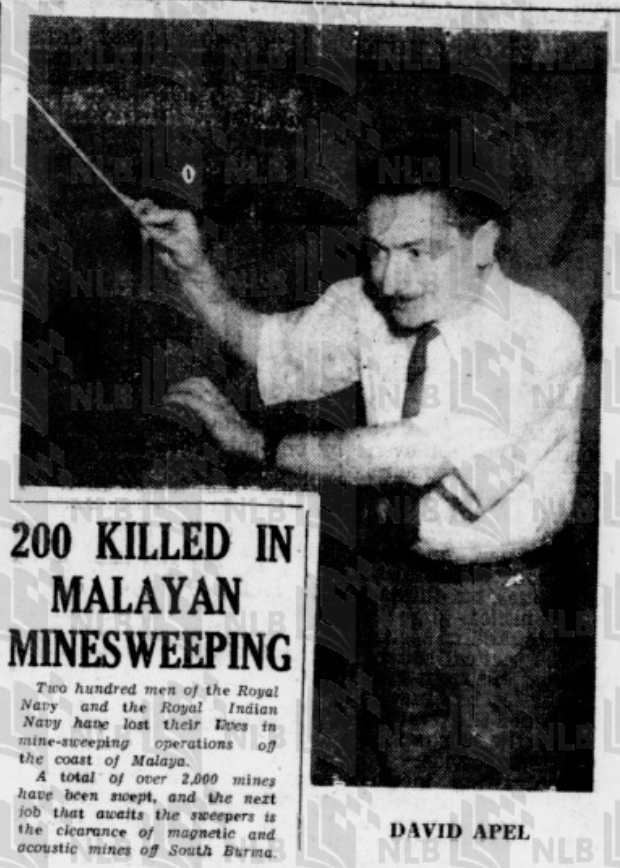
Apel conducting the Radio Malaya Orchestra in 1946

Shortly after the end of the Japanese occupation and the return of the British in 1945, Apel began working at Radio Malaya as the conductor of its orchestra, the Radio Malaya Orchestra, which was formed on 29 September had its first broadcast around 30 September. He served as the orchestra's conductor at its first public performance, called Music for Everybody, staged at the Victoria Memorial Hall, on its first anniversary. He continued the conduct the orchestra for its subsequent Music for Everybody concerts. In a review of the orchestra's 2 February 1947 concert, a critic of The Malaya Tribune opined that Apel was "at his best when conducting Haydn and little fault could be found with the performance". In a review of the orchestra's 2 March performance, the same critic wrote that Apel was "successful in securing some fine playing" and "[had] for Schubert the same loving understanding as he [had] for Haydn."

In November 1947, Apel announced that he would be resigning from Radio Malaya at the end of the month and that he would soon open a pianoforte studio and begin giving piano lessons. He claimed that piano teaching was "something [he had] always wanted to do." In March 1948, The Straits Times reported that Apel was a "well-known pianoforte instructor in Singapore." By July, Marie Aroozoo had become a student of his. In 1950, he organised and conducted for a concert which was to be held at the Victoria Memorial Hall on 12 and 13 December for the bicentenary of the death of Johann Sebastian Bach, featuring Bach's works, with the proceeds going to the Singapore Anti-Tuberculosis Association. He was the concert's originator and was reportedly the first to volunteer to produce it. Several of his students performed in the concert. However, the concert was instead postponed to 3 and 4 January 1951 due to the imposition of a curfew over the city.

In August 1953, Apel announced that he had composed a song, for which Percival Frank Aroozoo provided the lyrics, which would be submitted to the competition which was to decide the official City Day Song for that years' City Day celebrations, which were to take place the following month. On 7 September, Yap Han Hong, the superintendent of the Victoria Theatre and Memorial Hall, claimed that Apel was the only one who had presented a complete song by then. After an audition, the song was officially selected as the City Day Song for 1953. The Singapore Standard opined that the song was a "work of inspiration and a credit to its composer".

Apel served as the piano accompaniment to a recital by Czech violinist Ladislav Jásek, which was held at the Victoria Theatre on 7 February 1960 with a special performance for students held the afternoon before. This was his "comeback" to the stage after "an absence of nearly 20 years." He then served as the piano accompaniment at a recital by Filipino violinist Redento Romero, held at the Victoria Theatre on 20 May. This was then followed by him serving as the accompaniment to a recital by Penang-born violinist Kam Kee Yong, held at the St. John's Church Hall on 11 June. In 1961, Apel served as the piano accompaniment to a performance by Shanghai-born coloratura-soprano Chen Li Ching, held at the Victoria Theatre on 6 February. Tan Thuan Kok of The Straits Times then reported that he was a "leading accompanist" in Singapore and that through the appearances he had made as piano accompaniment he had "already established himself as an artiste in his own right." His obituary in the newspaper stated: "Besides teaching music in Singapore and importing Czech pianos and radios, he craved himself a permanent niche in the local music world with his frequent stage appearances."

== Personal life and death ==
Apel was Jewish and he had shortened his surname to "Apel" from "Apelbaum" by the time he had arrived in Malaya, though he was known as "Apelbaum" during the Japanese Occupation. He had married by 1942 and he and his wife lived on Mar Thoma Road. He had a daughter and a son. His son, George Apel, was a performer with the London Philharmonic Orchestra. Apel received his certificate of naturalisation in October 1952.

Apel was among those invited to fly on Czech Airlines' inaugural weekly service from Jakarta to Prague through Singapore. He left for Prague on holiday on 15 September 1967. The following day, while he was attending an opera, he suffered a sudden heart attack and died. His body was flown back to Singapore and he was buried in the now-defunct Jewish Cemetery of Thomson Road.
