= Duxton Plain Park =

Heritage park in Singapore

Coordinates: 1.2785°N 103.84137°E

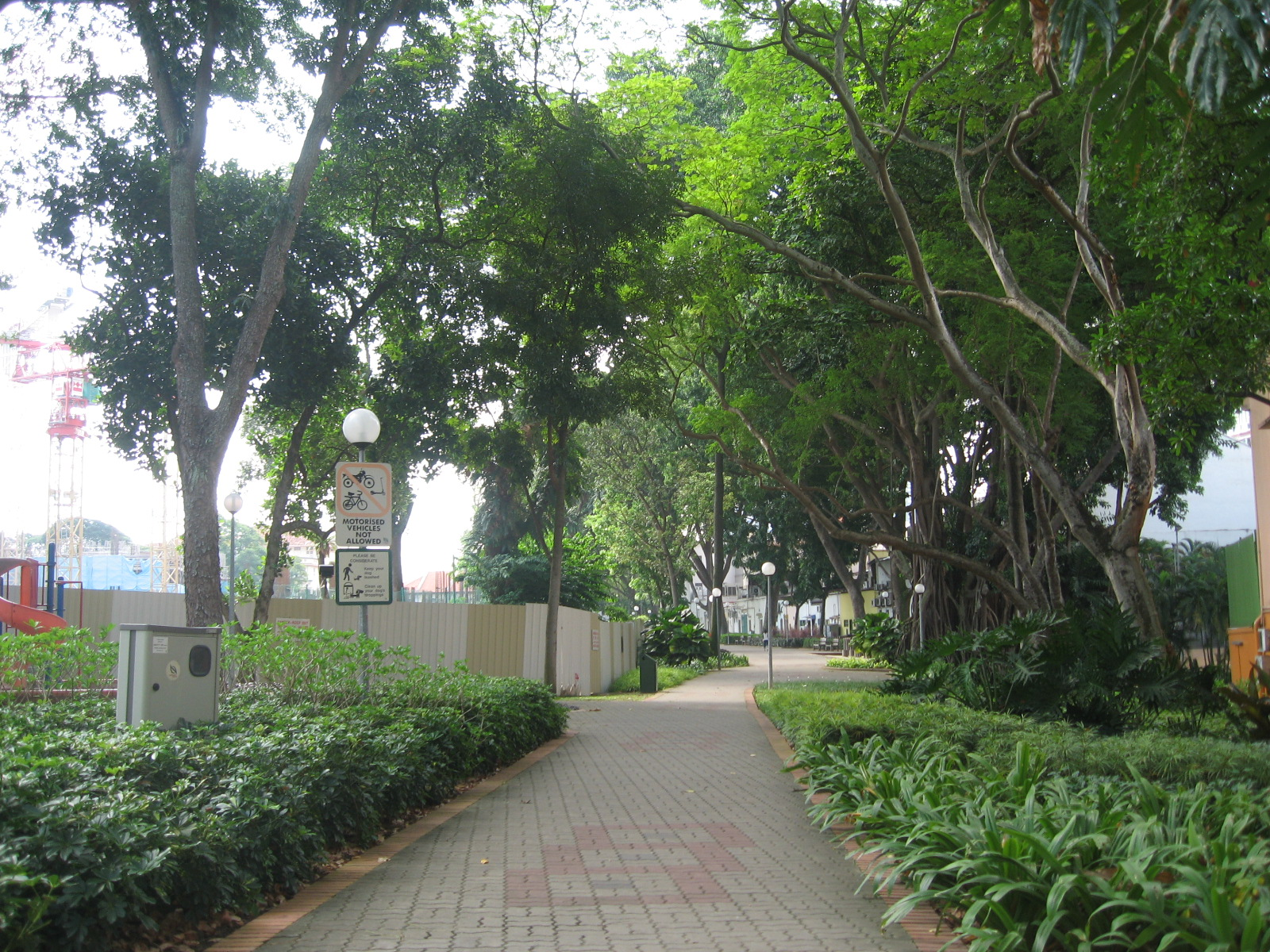

- Location within Singapore
- Location: New Bridge Road, Singapore 089140
- Nearest town: Tanjong Pagar
- Manager: National Parks Board
- Open: 1955; 71 years ago
- Status: Open
- Plants: Heritage trees including bodhi tree and Indian rubber tree
- Facilities: Sharifah Rogayah Keramat

Duxton Plain Park, also known as Duxton Plain Parkway, is a linear park located in Tanjong Pagar, within the Downtown Core area of Singapore. Formerly a British colonial railroad, it is now located in the vicinity of Duxton Hill.

== History ==
The area covered by the park was formerly a railroad that was established during British colonial rule. This railroad was part of the Singapore–Kranji Railway, which passed through Kranji from Tanjong Pagar and led to Pulau Saigon. They became defunct by 1932 and were relocated to pass through the centre of Tanjong Pagar instead, reportedly due to complaints of noise.

In 1955, plans were announced for the establishment of a linear park on the site of the old railway. This park would have been named "Duxton Plain Parkway." However, it was eventually named "Duxton Plain Park" when the founding Prime Minister of Singapore Lee Kuan Yew officially declared the park to be open to the public in May 1961. This linear park connected the Yan Kit and New Bridge roads located in the Downtown Core area of Singapore.

In 2015, then Prime Minister of Singapore, Lee Hsien Loong, buried a time capsule in the park and planted a tembusu tree there as a remembrance for his late father. Then in 2024, the Singapore Art Museum placed nine banners at the park encouraging people to explore it and the nearby Duxton Plain housing estate. Two of the banners were subsequently taken down after controversy when they were misinterpreted as encouraging stalker behaviour; they both told the reader to "Choose an apartment window to look at, keep staring until the inhabitant catches you staring."

== Features ==
=== Heritage trees ===
The park has several heritage trees, which include an Indian rubber tree and a Bodhi tree.

=== Sundial ===
An artificial sundial can be seen at the park. Next to it is a write-up about the sundial and how one can create their own sundial at home.

=== Lee Kuan Yew memorial tree ===
This tembusu tree was planted in memory of Lee Kuan Yew by his son, then Prime Minister of Singapore, in 2015. In the vicinity of the tree is a commemorative plaque which is embedded with a border of tributary beads made from flower petals. Additionally, the tembusu tree was said to have been a favorite of Lee Kuan Yew himself.

=== Sharifah Rogayah Keramat ===
Sharifah Rogayah Keramat
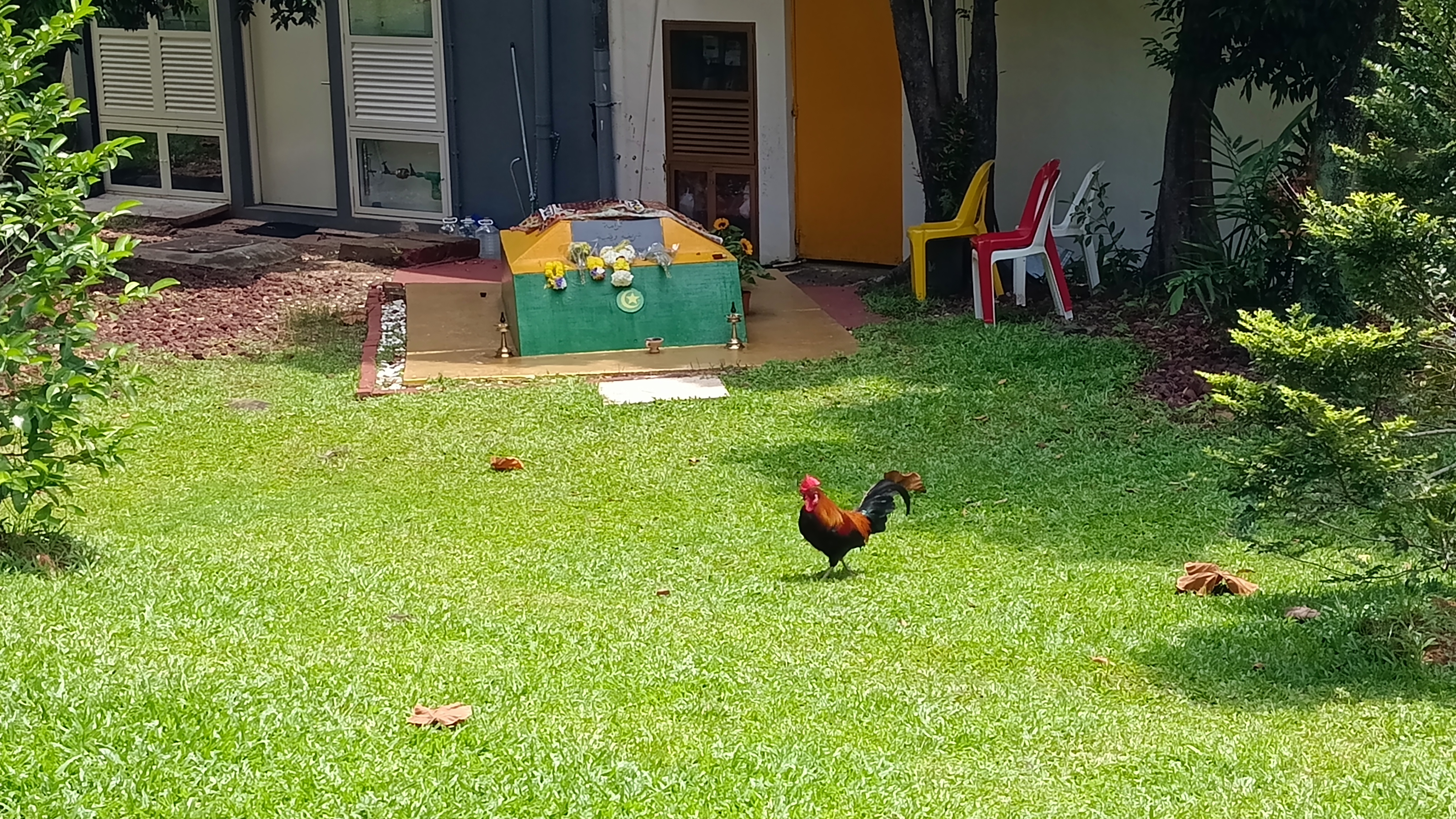
- The enshrined cenotaph of Sharifah Rogayah in Duxton Plain Park

General information
- Status: Active shrine
- Type: cenotaph
- Location: Keong Saik Road area of Duxton Plain Park
- Completed: c. 1930s

A keramat (enshrined grave) dedicated to an individual named Sharifah Rogayah is located in the park behind a row of shophouses. Sharifah Rogayah was the granddaughter of Habib Noh and she later married into the Aljunied family. The shrine has also survived the Second World War.

The history of the shrine is unclear, but it is first mentioned in a 1939 survey from The Straits Times newspaper, but without a name and simply a "keramat". Furthermore, the family of Sharifah Rogayah has denied that she is buried in Singapore, hence this shrine is only a cenotaph built in her memory. The shrine's main caretaker, Ahmad Ridhwan, who also claims familial relations to Habib Noh, affirms that the grave was identified with Sharifah Rogayah after he allegedly received a revelation from the saint herself in a dream.

== Accessibility ==
The park is accessible from between New Bridge Road and Keong Saik Road. The nearest train station to the park is Outram Park MRT station.

== See also ==
- Duxton Hill
- List of parks in Singapore
