= Teo Hong Road =

Road in Singapore

Coordinates: 1.2801°N 103.8407°E

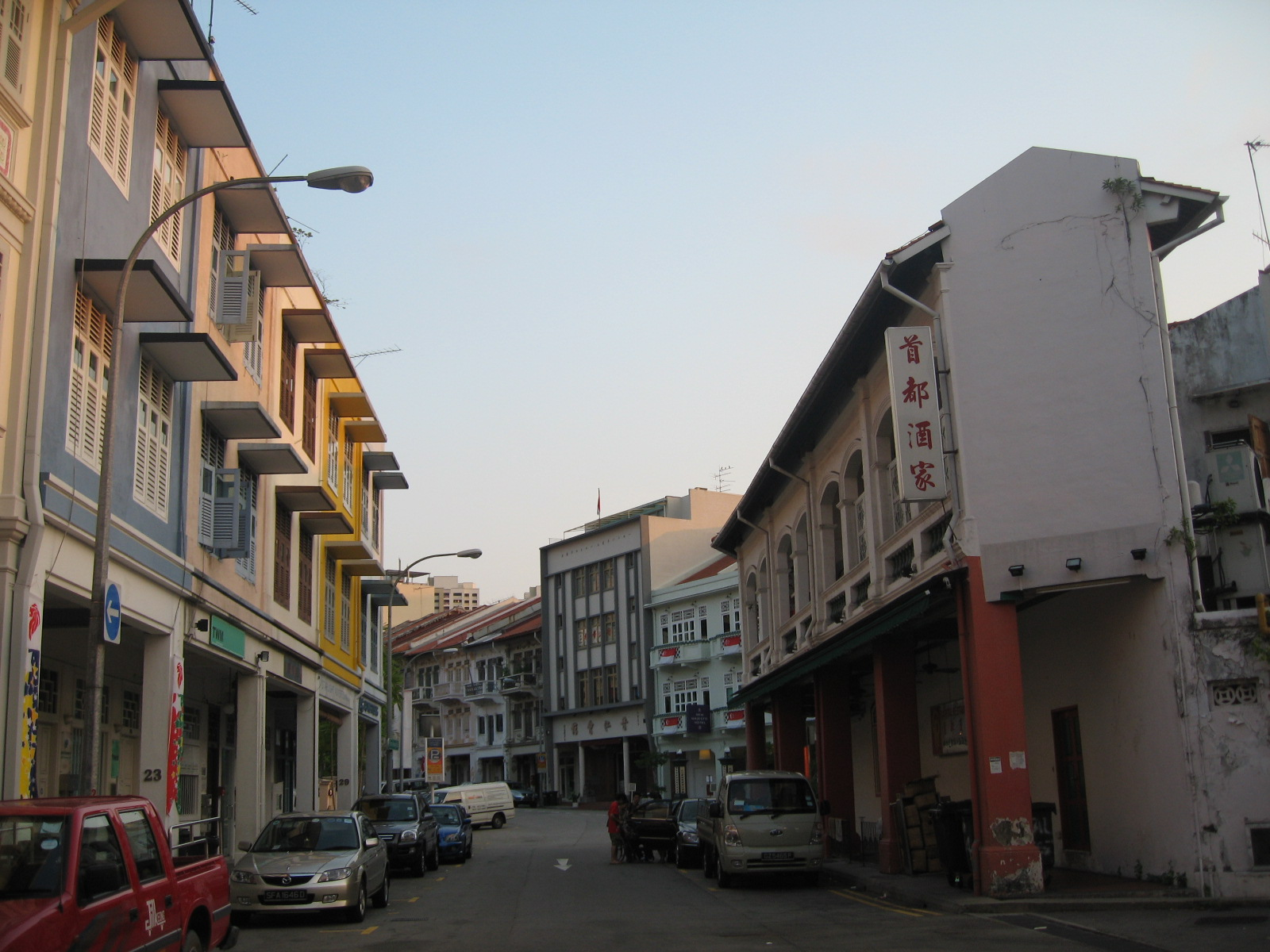
Teo Hong Road

Teo Hong Road (Chinese: 赵芳路; pinyin: Zhào fāng lù) is a one-way road located in the Tanjong Pagar area within the Outram Planning Area of Singapore. The road links Bukit Pasoh Road to New Bridge Road, and is lined with a row of conserved shophouses, built during colonial times. The conservation area is part of the Bukit Pasoh Conservation Area. The nearest MRT station is Outram Park MRT station.
