= Marie Bong =

Bong in the 1970s

Marie Ethel Bong (née Aroozoo; 1927 – 23 April 2003) was a Singaporean schoolteacher and social worker. She was the headmaster of the CHIJ Katong Convent from 1972 to 1986.

== Early life and education ==
Bong was born in Johor Bahru in 1927 to Percival Frank Aroozoo, a Eurasian who was the headmaster of the Gan Eng Seng School, and Agnes Danker. She was the sister of librarian Hedwig Anuar. Bong studied at the Convent of the Holy Infant Jesus. At the start of the Japanese occupation of Singapore, she and Hedwig paused their education to look after their siblings. In January 1947, she and Hedwig were each awarded $50 for their essay on the film Henry V. Bong received her degree at University of Malaya. She and Hedwig were among the university's earliest women graduates. Bong took an Honours degree in English literature in 1949.

== Career ==
Bong became a teacher at the CHIJ Katong Convent in 1953. In 1971, she gave a speech advocating for the inclusion of creative writing in lessons, which she believed would allow students to gain confidence, which "further helped to develop their personalities". She also claimed that it would "set the stage for Singapore to form her own reservoir of writers and literature." In the same year, though Bong was not a nun, she was appointed the convent's principal. She later claimed that she had been offered the position due to a shortage of local nuns who were willing to take up the position.

Bong was awarded the Pingat Berkebolehan in 1979. She produced the school's production of William Shakespeare's Julius Caesar, which was staged at the Victoria Theatre and Concert Hall in celebration of the school's golden jubilee in March 1980. Bong oversaw the school's split into the Katong Convent Secondary School and a primary school, after which she became the principal of the secondary school. As principal, she "almost single-handedly raised the level of consciousness of literature and the arts in her school."

Bong retired as principal in 1985, after which she became a social worker. She held speech and language lessons for teachers and the members of the Social Development Unit. She was also involved in storeytelling sessions for several branch libraries. In July 1991, she began holding storeytelling workshops for children participating in the Kids United National Storeytelling Contest. By 2000, she had held a speaking programme at Macpherson Primary School and "language camps" at several primary and secondary schools. Among Bong's students were academic and diplomat Chan Heng Chee, writers Suchen Christine Lim and Angeline Yap, newscaster Diana Koh, dancer Tammy Wong and actresses Neo Swee Lin and Noorlinah Mohamed. She also served as the editor of Saya, a local student literary magazine.

== Personal life and death ==
Bong married Anthony Bong Kim Siong at the Saint Joseph's Church on 16 September 1950. Bong was aged 23 while Anthony was aged 34. They had two children and lived in a semi-detached house in the Serangoon Garden estate. Bong died of a stroke in hospital at the age of 76 on 23 April 2003.
