= Gan Eng Seng School =

- 颜永成学校; Sekolah Gan Eng Seng கான் எங் செங் பள்ளி

Location
- 1 Henderson Road; Bukit Merah; 156561; Singapore
- Coordinates: 1°17′21.8″N 103°49′25.8″E

Information
- Type: Government; Co-educational
- Motto: Onward
- Established: 1885; 141 years ago
- Session: Single session
- School code: 3006
- Principal: Tan Hwee Pin
- Enrolment: 2405
- Colour: Red Green
- Website: ganengsengsch.moe.edu.sg

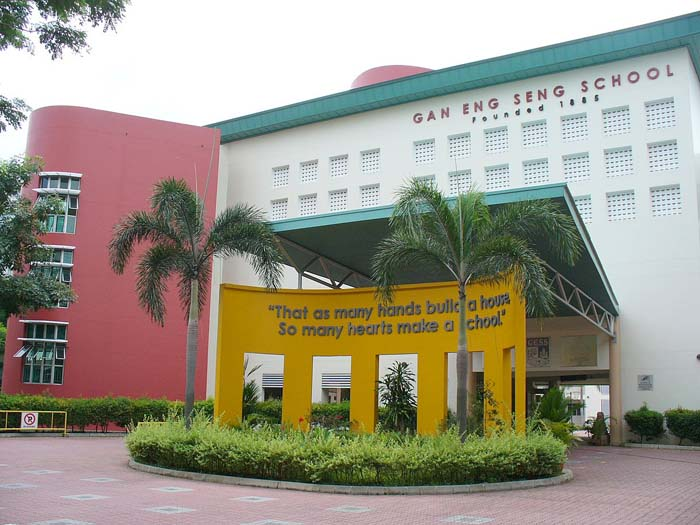
The present site of Gan Eng Seng School at 1 Henderson Road, Singapore

Gan Eng Seng School (GESS) is a co-educational government secondary school in Bukit Merah, Singapore. Founded in 1885 by philanthropist Gan Eng Seng, the school is the first school established by the overseas Chinese community in Singapore and is one of the oldest schools in the country.

GESS was a boys' school for 102 years before it became co-educational in 1987. The school was also the first in Singapore to form a parent-teachers' association in 1950. Currently, GESS is recognised among the top 50 schools in Singapore by the Ministry of Education. The school's founding site at Telok Ayer Street was designated as a national historical site by the National Heritage Board in 1997.

== History ==
=== 1885–1899 ===
Portrait of school founder and philanthropist, Gan Eng Seng (1844 - 1899)

It is a matter of marked importance that an institute of this kind should have been founded by a Chinese resident. I know of no similar institution in the colony... The school might be devoted to the study of English, but I am glad to know that a knowledge of Chinese will also be gained here, which to me appears to an essential part of the education of a Chinese boy.
-- Quote from a speech by Governor Sir Cecil Clementi Smith on opening of the new school building of Gan Eng Seng School on 4 April 1893

GESS was founded in some shophouses at Telok Ayer Street in 1885 by the philanthropist Gan Eng Seng and was known as "Anglo Chinese Free School". Born in 1844 into a poor family in Melaka, Gan came to Singapore at a young age to seek his fortune. Since he was unable to have much of an education in his youth, it was his ambition in life to build a school and help those who are poor as he prospered and became wealthy. Gan was far-sighted in placing emphasis on bilingualism in English and Chinese from the start. The school proved to be a success - the enrolment figure reached a record of 167 by 1890, and rose to an all-time high of 94% in 1892.

In 1888, GESS became an aided school, which meant government recognition as an education institution. In 1889, the British colonial government offered a site at No. 106 Telok Ayer Street. Gan accepted the site and wholly financed the construction and furbishment of the building which could accommodate up to 300 primary students.

Tan Keong Saik, a prominent Chinese businessman and board trustee of the school, briefly gave a history of the institution to the distinguished gathering. Before Gan died on 9 September 1899, in his will he had made provisions for the maintenance of the school and its management by a board of trustees.

=== 1899–1941 ===
The board of trustees was composed of distinguished pioneers of Singapore such as Tan Keong Saik, Ho Yang Peng, Wee Theam Tew, Lee Cheng Yan, Chan Sze Jin, Wee Swee Teow, Song Ong Siang, Lim Boon Keng and Gan's descendants. They all gave of their dedication, leadership and unfailing support to the school until 1938, when GESS became a government school.

In 1923, the school was renamed Gan Eng Seng School in its founder's honour. In the same year, the 8th Singapore Troop (now the Gan Eng Seng Dragon Scout Group) by G.C.S. Koch with 38 pioneering Scouts was founded. Chan Chon Hoe, who studied in GESS from 1921 to 1927, became the Troop Leader in 1927. Under the colonial system of education, GESS was a feeder school to Raffles Institution. The feeder school provides education up to the Standard V (equivalent of Primary 6 today), after which the student need to gain admission to Raffles Institution via an entrance examination if he wished to pursue his education to Standard IX (equivalent of Secondary 4 today). Chan attended Raffles Institution from 1928 to 1929, and the Scouts promoted to Raffles Institution from GESS were grouped under the Gan Eng Seng Patrol led by Chan. Due to his sound training and values inculcated in Scouting, Chan led a healthy lifestyle and lived strictly by the ethics of the Scout movement. Even at his advanced years in the 1990s, Chan participated in New Nation Walk and later the New Paper Walk well into his 90s, wearing his Scout uniform and badges on every occasion. Chan attended the school's centenary celebrations at Shangri-La Hotel in 1985 and was honoured by the Singapore Scouts Association in 2000 - he was the only person to have attended the very first and last Scouts' Jamboree in the 20th century before dying at the age of 94 in Singapore.

With the economical downturn in the early 1930s, the survival of the school was at stake when community funding dwindled and the school building had reached such a deteriorated state that major repairs were urgently needed. As the two-storey school building was made mainly of wood, it suffered badly from dry rot and termite infestation. In 1937, the board wrote to the Education Department detailing the plight of the school and urged the government to take over its management. In 1938, GESS became a government school and in the same year, the government proposed to build a new school building at Anson Road. However, no immediate plans were drawn up.

In July 1941, the Public Works Department declared the school building unsafe for occupation and ordered its evacuation. From September 1941 onwards, classes had to be held at two separate buildings in Sepoy Lines Malay School in Park Road and nearby Pearl's Hill School due to space constraints. On 5 December 1941, the school was closed for Christmas holidays but classes only resumed four and half years later.

=== 1941–1951 ===
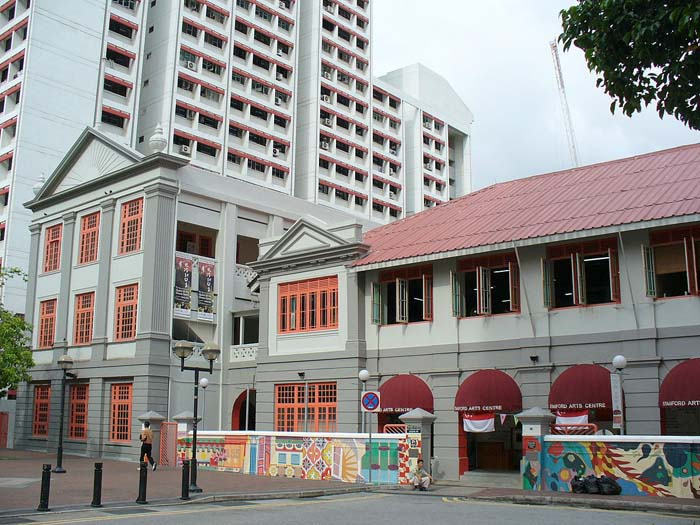
The former site of Gan Eng Seng School at 155 Waterloo Street (now the Stamford Arts Centre) between 1946 and 1951

During the Japanese occupation of Singapore, the school ceased to exist as it was shut down by the Japanese military administration. After the surrender of Japan, the British Military Administration took charge of Singapore and attempts were made to revive the school again. The school had lost most of its administrative documents, records, its former students and teachers at the aftermath of the war. The school was finally re-opened on the premises of Outram School by headmaster, Percival Frank Aroozoo on 13 May 1946. Aroozoo, a Eurasian of Portuguese descent, was the grandson of Simon Aroozoo, a close friend and colleague of Gan Eng Seng who had worked with Gan at Guthrie and Company for 50 years. A year later, the school was moved to the former Japanese National School building (now the Stamford Arts Centre) at No. 155 Waterloo Street and remained there until 1951. During this period, GESS was still a primary school. The teething problems were soon over and in December 1949, Aroozoo launched the school's periodical Onward to chronicalise the legacy and milestones of the school. On 29 May 1950, GESS became the first school in Singapore to form a parent-teacher association. Its formation was an initiative by Aroozoo, who said, "Parents as much as the teacher have a great deal to do with the training and development of a child as a useful member of the community."

In the same year, the construction of a new school building in Anson Road began. Aroozoo had commissioned Italian sculptor Rudolfo Nolli to deliver two school crests, one slated for outdoor placement at the main block overlooking the school entrance and the other, for indoor placement inside the school hall above the stage. Some of Nolli's notable works included the Supreme Court Building, City Hall, Fullerton Building and the Merdeka Lions. The two iconic crests by Nolli were lost when the school moved on to Raeburn Park in 1986.

=== 1951–1959 ===
Not only is it the first to be opened under the Ten-Year Plan... but it's a link with the past: a bridge between the old and the new... Raffles Institution went through the same stages in its history and I am confident that Gan Eng Seng School will rise to the same heights of academic and athletic distinction as Raffles Institution has achieved.
-- Quote of speech by Governor of Singapore, Sir Franklin Gimson, on opening of Gan Eng Seng School building on 15 May 1951

A new chapter in the history of GESS began in 1951 with the opening of the new school premises in Anson Road, as a secondary school ever since. For the second time in the school's history, Governor Sir Franklin Gimson officiated its opening on 15 May 1951. He was confident that the school would rise to heights of academic and athletic distinction. The new building could accommodate some 800 students in 20 classrooms, had an assembly hall, a library and a science block. In the school hall, Gimson also unveiled a portrait of Gan Eng Seng that was presented as a gift by the parent-teacher association "to honour the late Mr Gan Eng Seng for his great services to education". As the school developed through the decades, its students affectionately called GESSIANS brought honour to the school. Many students went on to post-secondary and tertiary education, and in 1966 seven students were awarded Colombo Plan scholarships. The uniformed groups, namely Scouts, National Cadet Corps, National Police Cadet Corps, St John Ambulance Brigade and Brass Band, achieved eminence in their respective units, often at national level to this day.

=== 1959–1986 ===
With Singapore's independence after its separation from Malaysia in 1965, manpower consideration assumed top priority in education planning. The emphasis on technical training and post-secondary education led to GESS being singled out as a centre for technical training and a pre-university school in 1970. In 1982, GESS was chosen to participate in its first mass display item titled Singapore - Past, Present and Future inspired by the movie Star Wars, featured interesting movement danced to the theme music of the movie. GESS participated at the Singapore Youth Festival that year, followed by the National Day celebrations in August and in 1983, at the Opening Ceremony when Singapore played host to the 12th Southeast Asian Games at the National Stadium.

In 1985, the school celebrated its centenary year with celebrations that included a party for the under-privileged children, a walkathon, a variety concert, an exhibition and a grand dinner, during which Minister for Communications and Information Yeo Ning Hong was the guest-of-honour. In September 1985, the MOE announced that GESS would move from Anson Road to Raeburn Park in mid-1986 and would cease to be a boys' school in 1987.

=== 1986–2000 ===
In 1986, the school was relocated to Raeburn Park after spending 35 years at the Anson Road's premises. The school became co-educational with the first intake of girls into Secondary 1 in January 1987 and the phasing out of the pre-university classes by 1991. By 1996, GESS was ranked 21st by the Ministry of Education among the top 50 schools in Singapore and continued to stay within the top 50 rankings to this day.

In 1995, the GESS's Scouts celebrated the school's 110th anniversary by building a light two-seater aeroplane, Microlight Challenger that was supervised by five pilots who were former Scouts of GESS. The plane was paraded at the anniversary dinner in front of guests that included guest-of-honour S. Vasoo, Member of Parliament for Tanjong Pagar GRC and an old boy.

The school's library was renamed the Percival Aroozoo Library on 20 July 1996 as a tribute to one of GESS's most beloved principals. The Ceremony was officiated by three of Aroozoo's daughters: former National Library Board director Hedwig Anuar; former CHIJ Katong Convent principal Marie Bong; and former LASALLE College of the Arts librarian Eleanor Smith. On 30 August 1997, the school celebrated its recognition by the National Heritage Board as one of the six oldest schools in Singapore by marking its founding site at 106 Telok Ayer Street. This marker is sited nearby at the junction of Telok Ayer and Cecil Streets.

=== 2000 onwards ===
In December 2000, GESS moved to its new site at No. 1 Henderson Road, its eighth home, where it stands to this day. The new School building bears the hallmark of many GESSIANS both past and present, who have contributed and helped in the architectural design, the setting up of the Alumni Room and Heritage Hall in the school. The new school premises and the Heritage Hall was officially opened on 2 August 2001 by Education Minister Teo Chee Hean.

To celebrate the 120th anniversary of GESS, the Gan Eng Seng School Old Students' Association (GESSOSA) published a pictorial history book in 2006 to document the school's rich traditions and history as well as the contribution made by its pioneers, old students and staff. All sale proceeds of the 230-page book were channelled into a students' fund for use to help any needy students. A copy was donated to Lee Kong Chian Reference Library for public reference.

== Identity and culture ==
=== Crest ===
The choice of red and green for the school crest had been influenced by the colours of the Gan Eng Seng Scout Troop. The Scout Troop's scarves were red and green. The dragon on the crest is a traditional Chinese emblem of good luck, courage and determination. Red is the colour of fire and suggests the fire of courage and leadership as written in the school song. The junk is a symbol of the slow but irrevocable progress which the school has achieved over the last 100 years. Green in colour to suggest the peaceful but relentless educational spirit which has guided the progress of the school. The school's motto - "Onward" - with its sense of determination reminds one of the slow, painful but relentless advances which have been made over the last century.

=== Uniform ===
Boys in lower secondary wear a white short-sleeved shirt with white short trousers while boys in upper secondary wear the same white short-sleeved short with white long pants. Girls wear a white short-sleeved blouse with a green skirt. On formal occasions such as the weekly assembly, all students wear a maroon school tie embroidered with the school emblem.

== Campus ==
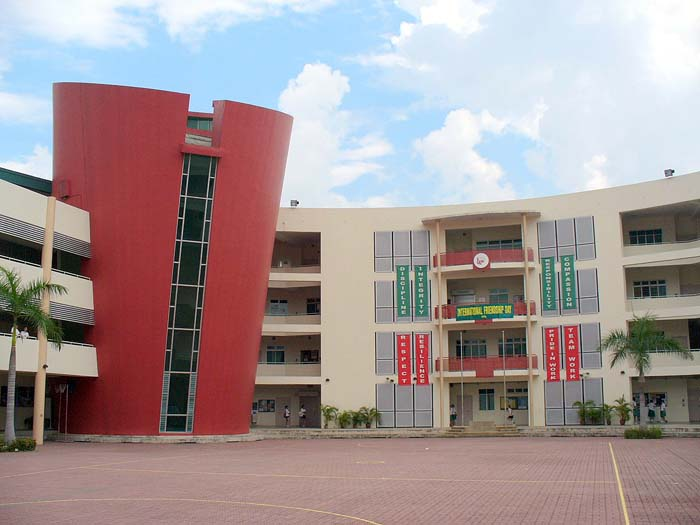
The assembly area of Gan Eng Seng School at Henderson Road campus

The campus was designed by eleven architects headed by project architect Jimmy Lam, an alumnus of the school. Design inspiration was taken from the symbol of the school crest, namely the Dragon and the Ship. The colours used bear resemblance to the school colours. Its final look and feel are reminiscent of the old Anson Road campus. The building includes the Arena, where the daily flag raising ceremonies, parades and special functions are held, the Heritage Gallery, the school's tallest structure, and the Alumni Room, a gathering place for students.

== Academic information ==
As a government secondary school, GESS offers three academic streams, namely the four-year Express course, as well as the Normal Course, comprising Normal (Academic) and Normal (Technical) academic tracks.

=== GCE O Level Express Course ===
The Express Course is a nationwide four-year programme that leads to the Singapore-Cambridge GCE Ordinary Level examinations. As of 2006, 97.3% of its Secondary 4 (Express) students qualify for junior college admission. 99.5% obtained passes in 3 O-level subjects and 97.8% passes in 5 O-level subjects. 4 students scored 8 distinctions and 51 students scored 5 distinctions. GESS was highlighted in MOE's press release for having students with outstanding results at the 2007 GCE O-Level Examination.

==== Academic subjects ====
The examinable academic subjects for Singapore-Cambridge GCE Ordinary Level offered by GESS for upper secondary level (via. streaming in secondary 2 level), as of 2018, are listed below.

Notes:

1. All students in Singapore are required to undertake a Mother Tongue Language as an examinable subject, as indicated by ' ^ '.
2. "SPA" in Pure Science subjects refers to the incorporation of School-based Science Practical Assessment, which 20% of the subject result in the national examination are determined by school-based practical examinations, supervised by the Singapore Examinations and Assessment Board. The SPA Assessment has been replaced by one Practical Assessment in the 2018 O Levels.
3. Subject Combinations for Express Course as of 2018:

Option A- EL, MTL, EM, HU (SS+HI/GE), ART or D&T, AM or POA, SCI (Phy+Chem)
Option B- EL, MTL, EM, HU (SS+HI/GE), AM, CH with BI or CH with PH or CH with LIT
Option C- EL, MTL, EM, HU (SS+HI/GE), AM, CH, BI, PH or LIT

Sciences & Mathematics	Language & Hunanities	Arts & Aesthetics
Additional Mathematics; Mathematics; Pure Physics; Pure Chemistry; Pure Biology; Science (Phy+Chem); Science (Bio+Chem), only offered for NA(O) SBB	English Language; Core Literature; Mother Tongue Language (Chinese, Malay, Tamil); Higher Chinese; Combined Humanities (Social Studies & History/Geography)	Art; Design & Technology; Food & Nutrition; Music; Principles of Accounts

=== Normal Course ===
The Normal Course is a nationwide 4-year programme leading to the Singapore-Cambridge GCE Normal Level examinations, which runs either the Normal (Academic) curriculum or Normal (Technical) curriculum, abbreviated as N(A) and N(T) respectively.

==== Normal (Academic) Course ====
In the Normal (Academic) course, students offer 5-8 subjects in the Singapore-Cambridge GCE Normal Level examination. Compulsory subjects include:

- English Language
- Mother Tongue Language
- Mathematics
- Combined Humanities

A 5th year leading to the Singapore-Cambridge GCE Ordinary Level examination is available to N(A) students who perform well in their Singapore-Cambridge GCE Normal Level examination. Students can move from one course to another based on their performance and the assessment of the school principal and teachers.

==== Normal (Technical) Course ====
The Normal (Technical) course prepares students for a technical-vocational education at the Institute of Technical Education. Students will offer 5-7 subjects in the Singapore-Cambridge GCE Normal Level examination. The curriculum is tailored towards strengthening students’ proficiency in English and Mathematics. Students take English Language, Mathematics, Basic Mother Tongue and Computer Applications as compulsory subjects.

== Co-curricular activities (CCAs) ==
=== GESS sports houses ===
Before 1938, the boys were divided into 5 houses which had their respective logos for sporting activities and other competitions. They were named after famous names on the school's Board of Trustees:

- Gan House (after Gan Eng Seng)
- Lim House (after Lim Boon Keng)
- Chan House (after Chan Sze Jin)
- Song House (after Song Ong Siang)
- Lee House (after Lee Cheng Yan)

The house system was dropped for a period of nine years from 1972 to 1980. In 1980, it was renamed after their trustee in their full name. Gan House was replaced by Chen Su Lan House, after Chen Su Lan, another prominent trustee in the old days. The flags of the Houses no longer adopt their previous logos but simply a coloured flag with the name of the house spelled across the flag. Today, only four house names remain: Lim Boon Keng, Chan Sze Jin, Lee Cheng Yan and Chen Su Lan.

As part of its co-curricular activities for students, GESS has six uniformed groups, five sport teams and ten special interest groups in its offerings to date.

=== Achievements ===
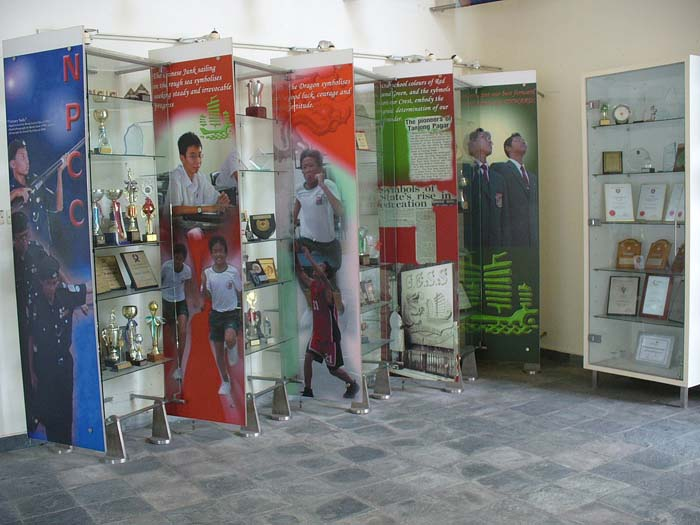
Showcases of past national awards and achievements at the school's Awards Gallery

- GESS has been officially recognised by MOE as a niche school for uniformed groups when four of its uniformed groups namely NCC, Scouts, NPCC and SJAB received or co-won the Sustained Achievement Awards (2000–2005).
- National Youth Achievement Award: BRONZE - 45, SILVER - 2.
- GESS National Police Cadet Corps won SILVER or GOLD award consistently for Unit Overall Proficiency Award since 2000.
- GESS Dragon Scouts won the Frank Cooper Sands Award since 1997 and the Gold Award since 2003.
- GESS National Cadet Corps was the only school to stay within the top 5 position since 1985.
- GESS St John's Ambulance Brigade clinched GOLD in 2004 and 2005 CCA Award. Overall CHAMPIONS for 2004 and 2006 footdrill competition.
- GESS Girls’ Brigade 71st company won SILVER for The Girls’ Brigade Singapore Company Award in 2004 and 2005.

== Alumni ==
=== Gan Eng Seng School Old Students' Association ===
Headed officially by Kiang Ai Kim in 1958 after some old boys had expressed a desire to form such an association to keep in touch with the school and with one another earlier. Since then, GESSOSA has continuously organise activities to strengthen the bond of old students to their alma mater. During its long history, it has managed to organise some highly successful past functions like Career Forums, Students' Mentoring Scheme, April Ball to raise funds for the association's scholarship and charity schemes.

One of the regular events is the Annual Dinner, is held annually to foster old ties not just for the alumni but also include teachers past and present, members of the Gan's Association to be updated with the latest happenings in and around the school. GESSOSA also co-organises the school's Anniversary Dinners which have been held every 5 years (except 1990). Notable alumnus were usually invited to attend as Special Guest to grace the event. GESSOSA has a dedicated room that is nestled in the school CCA Block that continue to serve as a melting pot for both past and current students to this day.

Notable alumni include:

- Borhan Abu Samah, former national footballer
- Chan Chon Hoe, oldest Scout and GESS alumnus, and last surviving witness of the aftermath of the 1915 Singapore Mutiny
- Chua Kim Yeow, former Accountant-General of Singapore and candidate in the 1993 Singaporean presidential election
- Khoo Kay Chai, former principal of Singapore Polytechnic
- Kiang Ai Kim, retired chemistry professor at the National University of Singapore
- Koh Poh Tiong, former chief executive officer of Asia Pacific Breweries
- David Ong, former member of parliament for Jurong GRC
- R. Palakrishnan, criminal lawyer and former president of the Law Society of Singapore
- Daren Tan, singer
- S. Vasoo, former member of parliament for Tanjong Pagar GRC
- Leon Jay Williams, actor and singer
- Yeo Ning Hong, former Cabinet minister

== See also ==
- Gan Eng Seng
- Gan Eng Seng School Founding Site
- Ministry of Education (Singapore)
