= Keong Saik Road =

Road in Chinatown, Singapore

Coordinates: 1°16′48.7″N 103°50′29.6″E

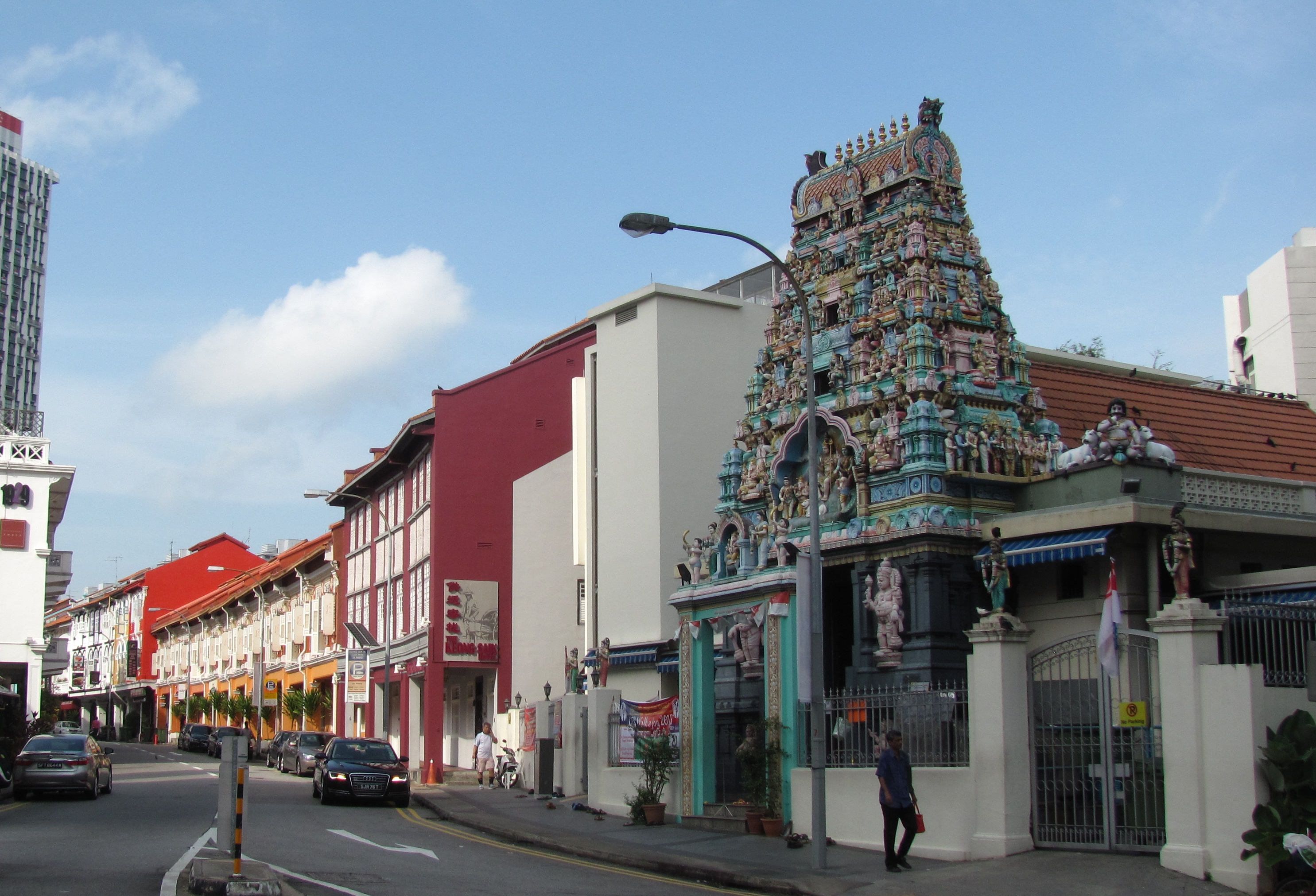
Sri Layan Sithi Vinayar Temple, Keong Saik Road, Singapore

Keong Saik Road (IPA: /ˌkjɒŋ ˈsɛk, - ˈseɪk/ KYONG SEK or -SAYK, Chinese: 恭锡路 / 恭錫路; Pe̍h-ōe-jī: kiong-sek-lō͘) is a one-way road located in Chinatown within the Outram Planning Area in Singapore. The road links New Bridge Road to Neil Road, and is intersected by Kreta Ayer Road.

== Etymology and history ==
Keong Saik Road was named in 1926 after the Malacca-born Chinese businessman, Tan Keong Saik, in remembrance of his contribution to the Chinese community.

The stretch of road became a prominent red-light district with many brothels located in the shophouses on either side of the street in the 1960s. The street, along with the Sago Lane areas became notoriously known as one of the "turfs" operated by the Sio Loh Kuan secret society. The 1990s opened a new chapter for the road, with the site sprouting many "boutique hotels" like Naumi Liora, Hotel 1929, the Regal Inn and Keong Saik Hotel. Keong Saik Road now mainly houses coffee shops, art galleries and other shops for commercial use.

The Bukit Pasoh conservation area, which was conserved on 7 July 1989, is bounded by Keong Saik road and other roads. Some shophouses along Keong Saik Road were given conservation status on 12 April 1990 and the remaining shophouses were given the same status on 25 October 1991.

In 2017, it was selected as one of the top ten destinations in Asia by Lonely Planet Magazine.

== Buildings ==
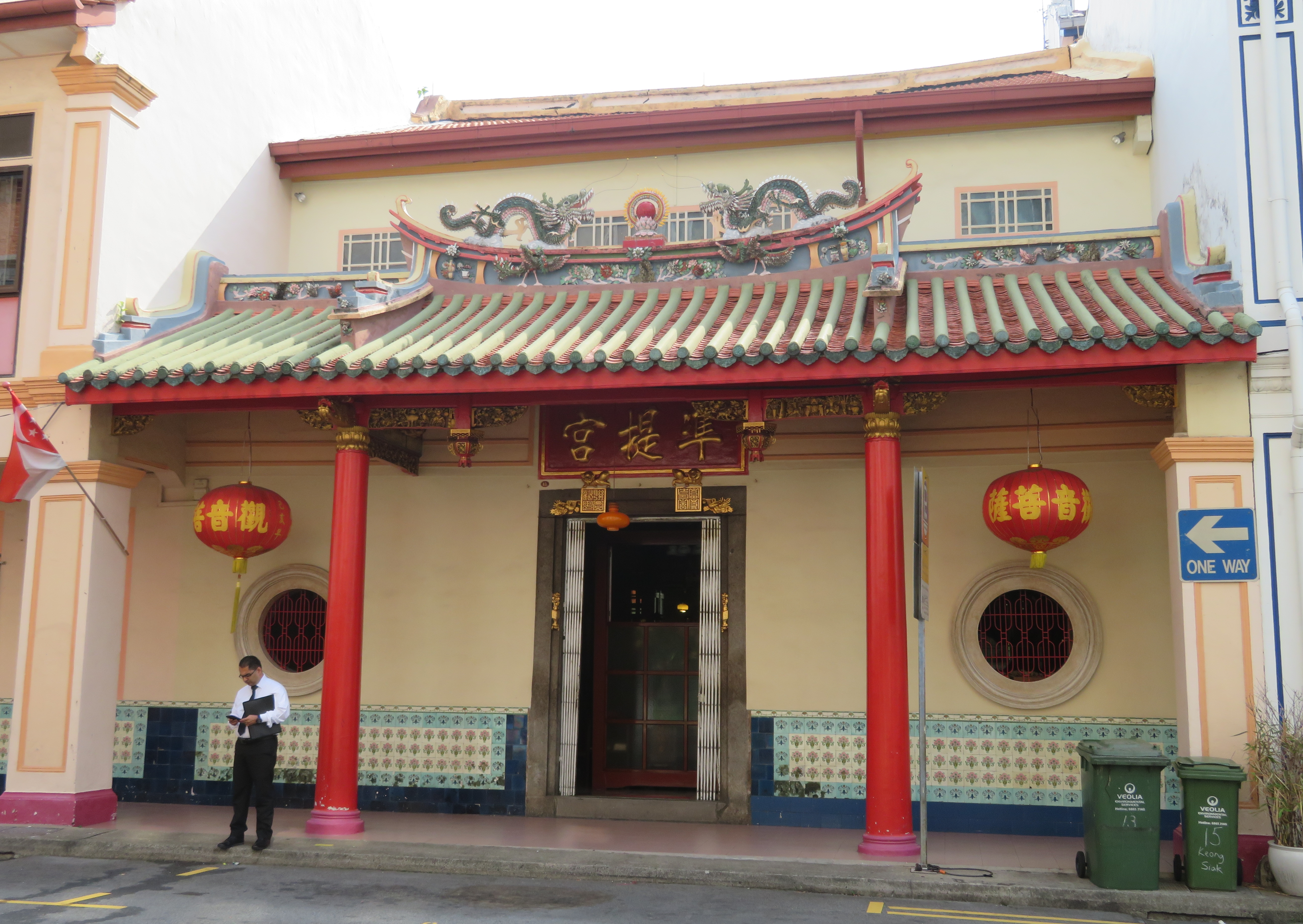
Cundhi Gong Temple, Keong Saik Road, Singapore

One of the most sightworthy buildings is Cundhi Gong Temple (準提宫) at No. 13 Keong Saik Road, which was built in 1928 in the Nanyang style. The temple, which is dedicated to the Guan Yin, Bodhisattva of Compassion, is a two-storey building without a forecourt and has an area of 400 square metres.

Sri Layan Sithi Vinayagar Temple at no. 73 Keong Saik Road was built in 1925. The temple was consecrated in 1975, 1989, 2007 and in 2019. The five-storey Rajagopuram was added in 2007 when the temple was renovated and redesigned.
