= Duxton Hill =

Road in Singapore

Coordinates: 1°16′43.6″N 103°50′34.2″E

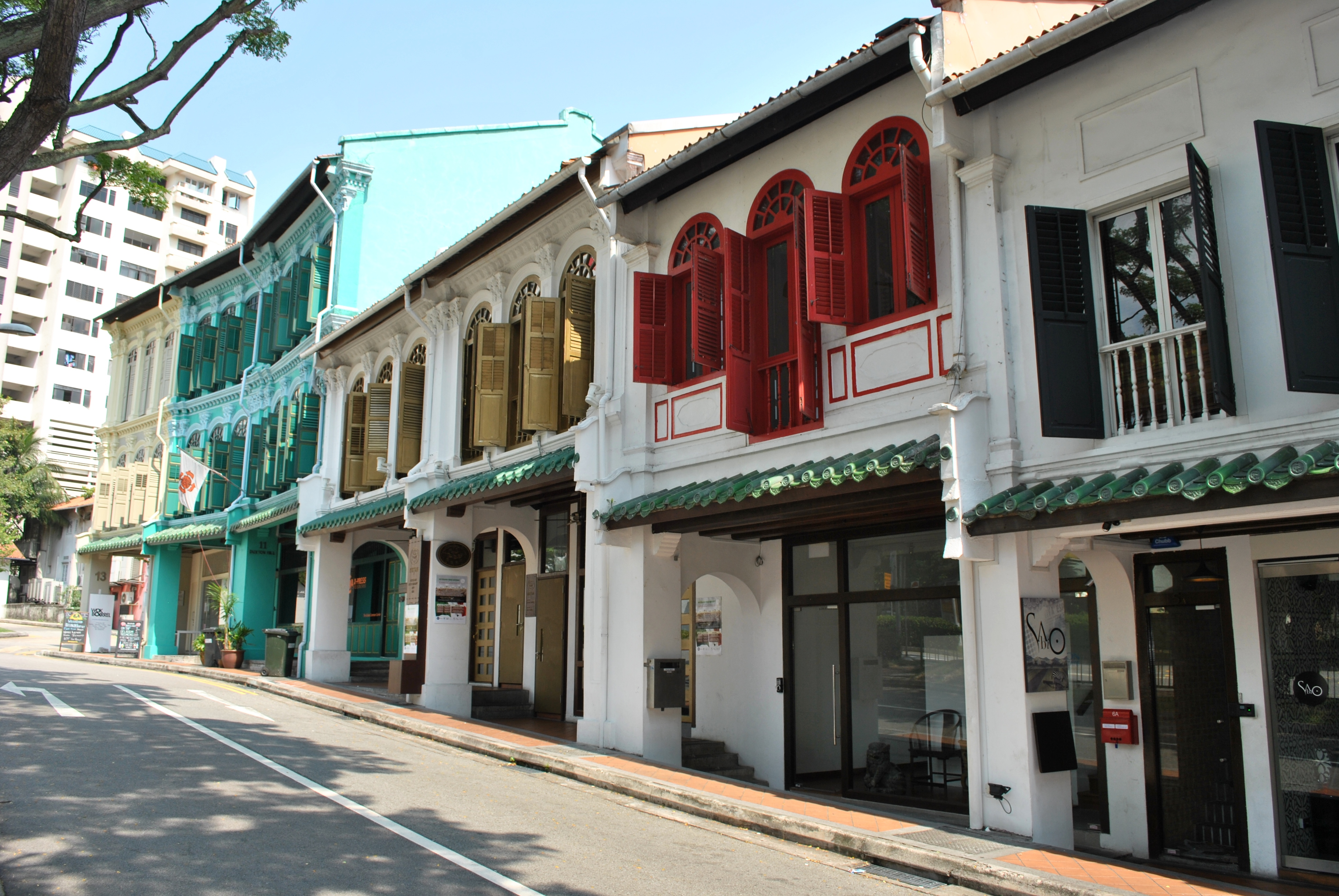
- Duxton Hill

Highest point

Geography
- Location within Singapore
- Location: Singapore
- Parent range: 13 hectares (130,000 m^{2})

Geology
- Mountain type: hill

Duxton Hill (Chinese: 达士敦山; Pinyin: Dáshìdūnshān) is a small hill, as well as the name of a road, located in Tanjong Pagar in the Downtown Core district of Singapore.

The road leads from Tanjong Pagar Road to the peak of the hill, and is intersected by Duxton Road (达士敦路; Dáshìdūnlù). Duxton Road is a one-way road linking Neil Road to Craig Road.

== Etymology and history ==
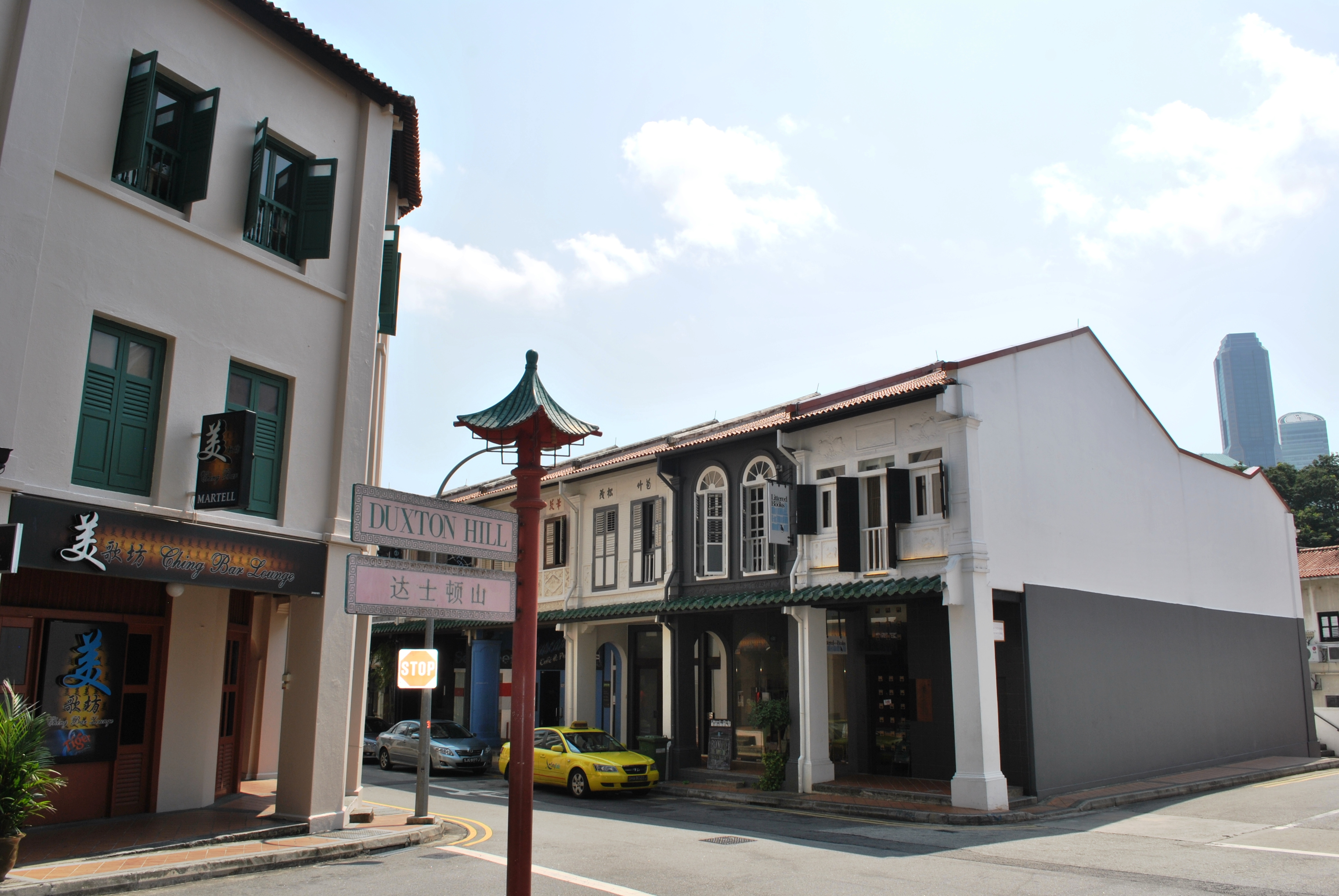
Duxton Hill

The Duxton Hill area sits on the former 13-hectares nutmeg plantation with 1,800 trees of Dr J. William Montgomerie (1797–1856), who first arrived in Singapore in 1819 and became an Assistant Surgeon in the service of the British colonial government. Duxton was the name of one of his two dwelling houses in the area, namely the Craig Hill and Duxton House. Duxton House was built by Hugh Syme and was home to Montgomerie and his family.

After Montgomerie's death, the property was auctioned to Ker, Rawson and Company in 1856 and fragmented into building lots. Fourteen acres also went to Arab Syed Abdullah bin Omar Aljunied, who divided them into four lots which were leased to wealthy Chinese developers. Duxton Road, Duxton Hill and Craig Road were presumably constructed after the 1856 sale and named after the houses that once existed on the hill. At the time, the area was still called Duxton Hill. Later the Reverend J.T. Dickenson built a children's home here, now the Kreta Ayer Community Centre, and the hill was called Dickenson Hill (now the name of a distinct street) or Bukit Padre.

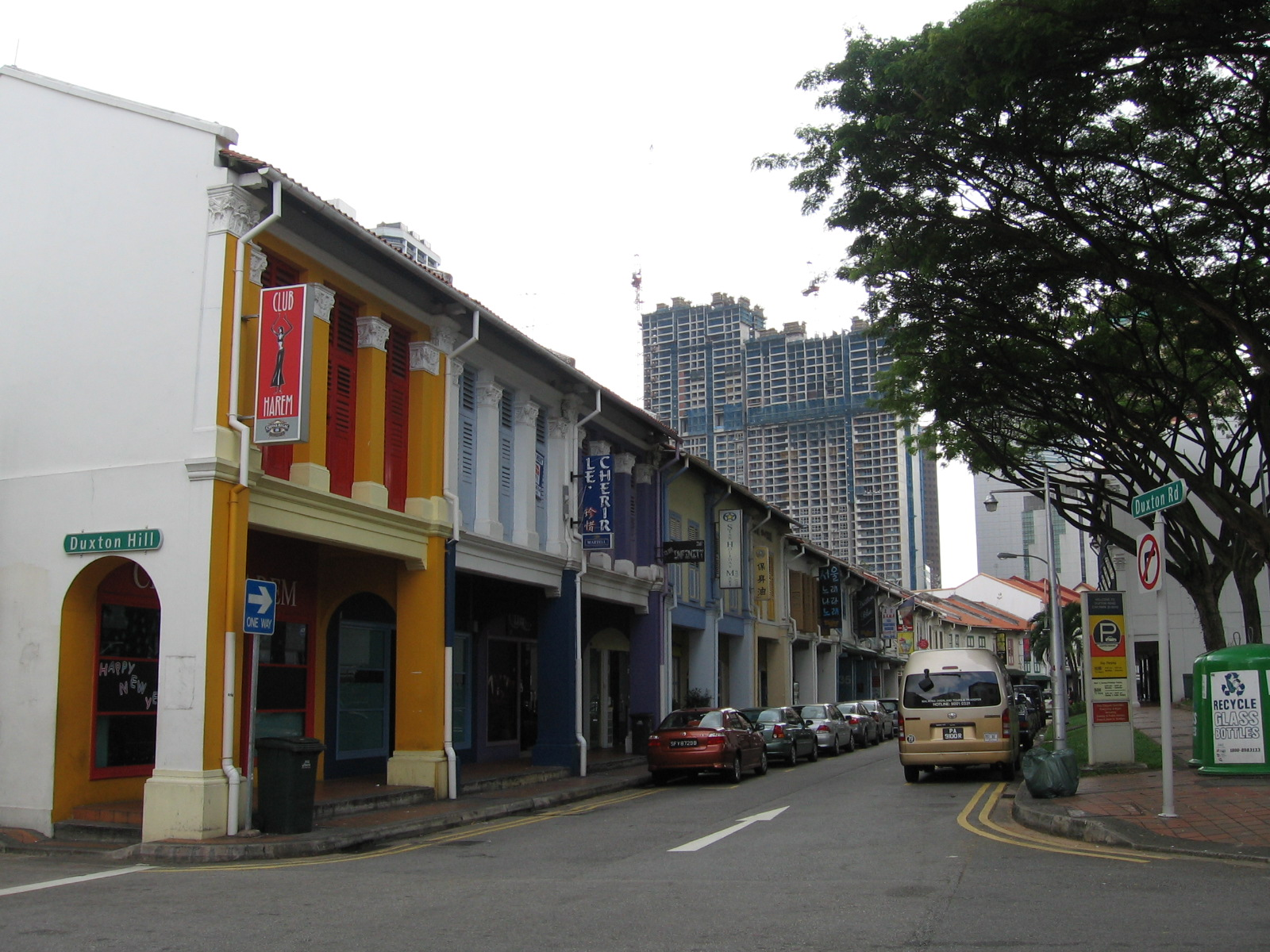
Duxton Road

Duxton Road was also popularly known by the Cantonese as Jinrickshaw Place (and sometimes Kampong Ah Lai) because of the many rickshaw pullers who parked their vehicles there at the close of day due to the road's proximity to the Jinricksha Station. Opium and gambling dens, as well as cheap brothels, used to flourish on Duxton Road, and one writer describes it as a slum area and a notoriously vice-ridden environment. These places were patronised by the rickshaw coolies who lived in Duxton Road and Duxton Hill. Many of the rickshaw pullers were Hokkiens from Hui'an County in China, and they bore surnames such as Teo, Ho and Chng. Because of the strong clan ties, the rickshaw pullers created their own area of land and fought whenever it was threatened. Such fights made Duxton Hill and Duxton Road a dreaded area. To make matters worse, the slums were home to criminal elements. Whenever the residents in Duxton Road had disputes, the Hui Ann Association was asked to be the mediator.

Despite the notoriety of the street, many wealthy Straits Chinese families built and occupied lofty and exquisitely designed residences and shophouses on Duxton Hill.

Duxton Road is known to the Hokkiens as gu chia chui kia, meaning "at the side of Kreta Ayer", referring to Craig Road. The road was also known colloquially as kampong kia nai in Hokkien, meaning "within a small village". This term was probably used to refer to the slum dwellings of the rickshaw pullers.

== Modern times ==
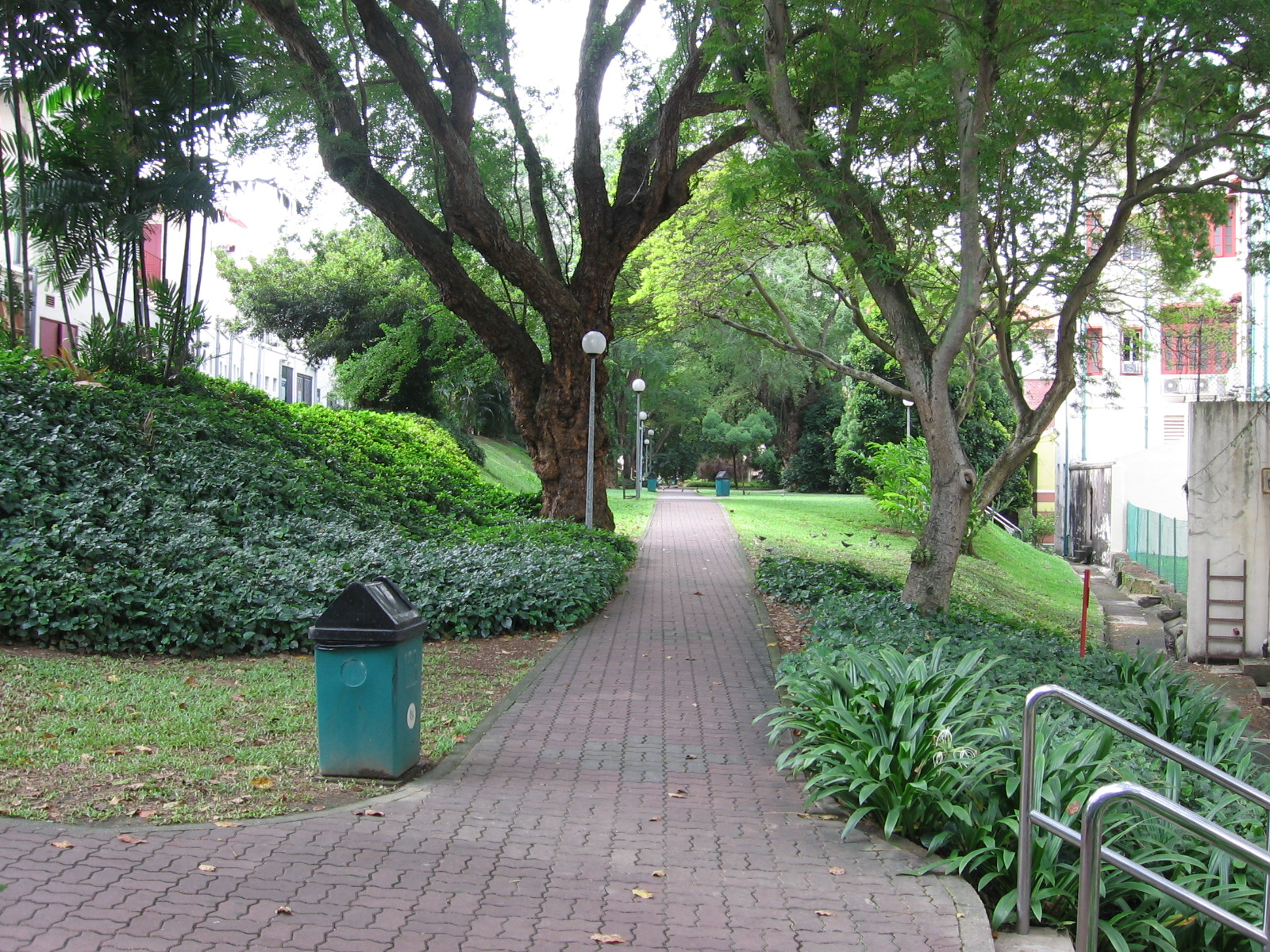
Duxton Plain Park

Today, Duxton Hill and Duxton Road have been conserved by the Urban Redevelopment Authority and currently lie within the Tanjong Pagar Conservation Area. Many restored two- and three-storey shophouses and terrace houses still exist on Duxton Road and Duxton Hill.

Buildings in the vicinity of Duxton Hill include the Craig Place, Chinatown Plaza and Apartments and the Singapore Institute of Architects. A section of Duxton Hill has been converted into a pedestrian mall. The Berjaya Duxton Hotel, also known as Duxton Hotel on Duxton Road, opened in the early 1990s, is made up of a row of converted shophouses. Inside many of the conserved shophouses are redlight district bars.

In Duxton Park, currently known as Duxton Plain Park, which extends from New Bridge Road to the former Yan Kit Swimming Complex and the back of Poo Thor Jee Temple (普陀寺), there is a keramat known as the Shrine of Sharifah Rogayah. A keramat is a Malay sacred place, usually a gravesite of a holy person, related to the religious belief of the Datuk Keramat worship.

By the 2000s, many of the shophouses had been converted to restaurants, bars and cafes popular with local residents and expatriates due to the neighborhood’s close proximity to the Central Business District and downtown.
