= Bukit Pasoh Road =

Road in Singapore

Coordinates: 1.2791°N 103.8384°E

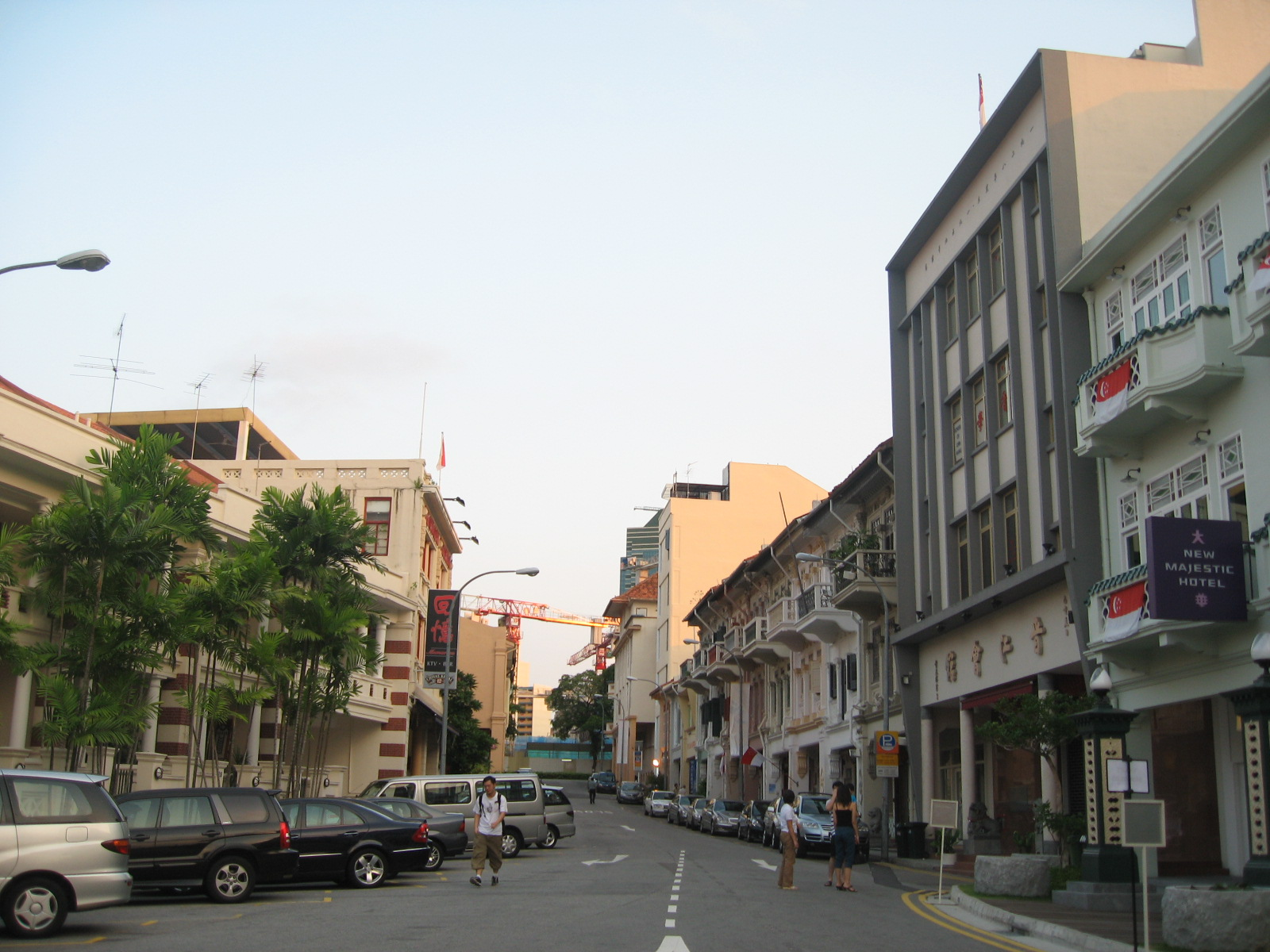
Bukit Pasoh Road

Bukit Pasoh Road (Chinese: 武吉巴梳路: Malay: Jalan Bukit Pasoh) is a road in Tanjong Pagar within the Outram Planning Area of Singapore. The road starts from Neil Road which is one way, but becomes two ways, when the road forks out into two parts, with one becoming Teo Hong Road, with both roads ending at New Bridge Road. The road is mainly lined with conserved shophouses.

== Etymology and history ==
Before Bukit Pasoh was named, there used to be many kilns on the hill which produced pots, bricks and tiles, inclusive of pasohs (meaning flower pot in Malaya, also known as Ali Baba jars or tongs) which were used to store rice or water.

Bukit Pasoh was initially named Dickenson's Hill after Rev J.T. Dickenson, followed by Bukit Padre and finally Bukit Pasoh. The road was located on the hill and named after the road

The street was nicknamed "the street of the clans" due to the numerous headquarters of Chinese cultural and clan associations located on the street. It was also nicknamed "Mistress Street" where mistresses were hidden along the shophouses along the street.

== Conservation ==
The road and its vicinity is a conservation area known as Bukit Pasoh Conservation Area, which is bounded by New Bridge Road, Keong Saik Road, Kreta Ayer Road, Neil Road and Cantonment Road. This area was given the conservation area status on 7 July 1989. The shophouses mainly consist of two and three storey shophouses in transitional, late and art deco styles.
