= Neil Road =

Road in Chinatown, Singapore

Coordinates: 1°16′40″N 103°50′34″E

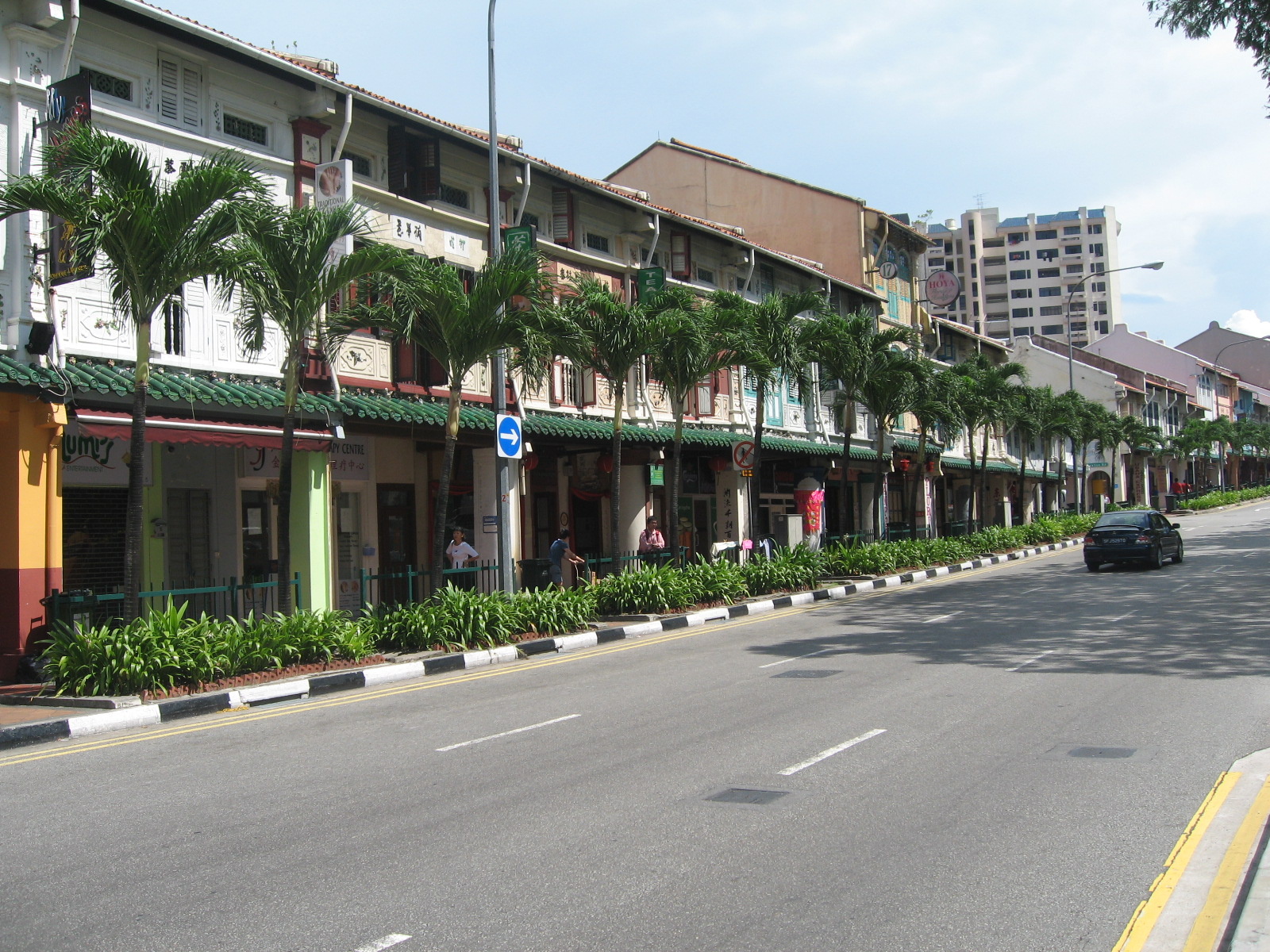
Neil Road in 2006

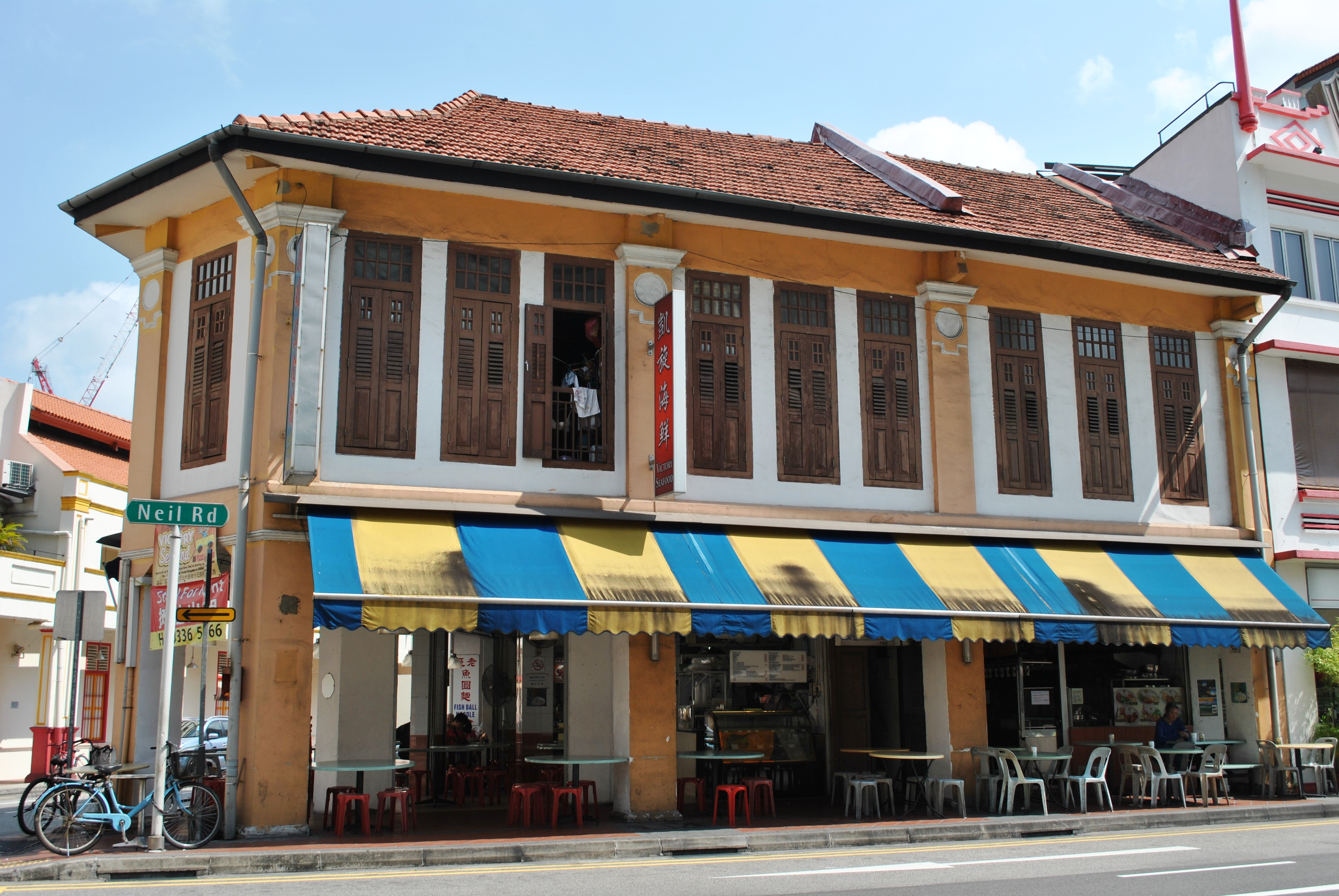
Neil Road in 2012

Neil Road (Chinese: 尼路) is a one-way road in Chinatown and Tanjong Pagar in the planning areas of Outram and Bukit Merah in Singapore. The road starts at the junction of South Bridge Road, Maxwell Road and Tanjong Pagar Road and ends at Kampong Bahru Road which then merges into Jalan Bukit Merah. At the end of the road, it is a conservation area of several shophouses and a three-story Victorian style school building, which was the former site of Fairfield Methodist Girls' School. In the Tanjong Pagar area of the road, it is home to rows of conserved shophouses for various purposes.

== Etymology ==
The road was formerly known as Silat, Selat or Salat Road, the Malay term for "straits" before renamed in 1858 to Neil Road. The Municipal Council renamed the road in honour of Colonel Neill of the Madras Fusiliers in India, who was involved in the Indian Rebellion of 1857.

In Hokkien, the road was known as goo chia chwee sia lo, which means "steep street of Kreta Ayer".

== Notable buildings ==
House number 147 belonged to Lee Hoon Leong, the grandfather of former Prime Minister of Singapore, Lee Kuan Yew, who bought the house in 1920 for $25,000. Lee Kuan Yew lived in the house for a few years with his parents and grandfather.

In 1912, Fairfield Girls’ School moved into a Victorian-style three-storey building on Neil Road in 1912. In 1983, the school moved out of the Neil Road.

== Locations ==
- 141 Neil Road
- 145 Neil Road
- Baba House
