= 2021 Tanjong Pagar car crash =

Road incident in Singapore

- Date: 13 February 2021
- Time: 5:41 am (SGT)
- Location: 37 Tanjong Pagar Road, Tanjong Pagar, Singapore; 1.2791°N 103.8440°E
- Type: High-speed vehicle collision and fire
- Cause: Speeding and drink-driving
- Participants: Jonathan Long Junwei (driver), Elvin Tan Yong Hao, Eugene Yap Zheng Min, Gary Wong Hong Chieh, Wilson Teo Qi Xiang (passengers) and Raybe Oh Siew Huey (observer)
- Deaths: 5
- Injuries: 1 (critical)

The 2021 Tanjong Pagar car crash was a fatal single-vehicle traffic incident that occurred on 13 February 2021, along Tanjong Pagar Road in Singapore. A white BMW M4 Coupe, carrying five occupants, crashed into a vacant shophouse at high speed and subsequently caught fire. All five occupants were killed; a sixth individual sustained life-threatening burns while attempting to rescue the occupants from the fire. The incident took place during the Chinese New Year holidays and prompted a national conversation regarding road safety, street racing and drink-driving penalties in Singapore.

== Background ==
At the time of the crash, the victims were current or former financial advisers of Aviva, who had gathered for a celebration on the second day of the Chinese New Year. Prior to the crash, several members of the group took turns driving a newly purchased BMW M4 Coupe around a 1.5-kilometer perimeter in the Tanjong Pagar area to test its performance.

== Incident ==
At approximately 5:40 am, Jonathan Long Junwei, 29, began a final circuit with four passengers: Eugene Yap Zheng Min, 29; Elvin Tan Yong Hao, 28; Wilson Teo Qi Xiang, 26; and Gary Wong Hong Chieh, 29. The car reached speeds between 148 km/h (92 mph) and 182 km/h (113 mph) in a zone with a 50 km/h (31 mph) limit. Long lost control of the vehicle, which skidded and rear-ended a pillar of a shophouse at 37 Tanjong Pagar Road.

The impact caused the fuel tank to rupture, leading to a massive fire approximately 15 seconds later. Raybe Oh Siew Huey, 26, the driver's fiancée, ran towards the burning wreckage and attempted to pull the occupants out, sustaining burns to 80 percent of her body. Emergency services arrived at 5:46 am and extinguished the fire by 6:08 am. All five occupants were pronounced dead at the scene from severe burns and traumatic injuries.

== Infrastructure and aftermath ==
Following the accident, the Building and Construction Authority (BCA) assessed 37 Tanjong Pagar Road and found the shophouse's structural integrity not to be compromised despite "surface scratches" on the columns. The Land Transport Authority (LTA) implemented several safety enhancements along the road, including road dividers, signalised pedestrian crossings at the intersection of Tras Link, and increased police patrols to deter speeding in the Central Business District. In 2025, the LTA announced plans to narrow and repurpose Tanjong Pagar Road to enhance pedestrian and cyclist safety. The project was to convert the thoroughfare into a single-lane, two-way street while removing roadside parking to accommodate wider footpaths and new cycling paths. To further reduce vehicle speeds, the redevelopment includes the installation of center dividers and road humps.

=== Safety concerns and speeding history ===
Following the 2021 collision, public attention shifted towards the long-standing issue of illegal speeding and noise pollution in the Tanjong Pagar area. Residents of the area, particularly those living in nearby public housing estate The Pinnacle@Duxton, reported that the stretch of road had effectively served as a "racing circuit" for high-performance vehicles for several years prior to the accident. Complaints were frequently lodged with local Member of Parliament (MP) Indranee Rajah, as well as the local town council, regarding engine revving and high-speed maneuvers occurring in the early morning hours, typically between 2:00 am and 5:00 am. Local business owners and residents noted that the straight layout of the road and its proximity to nightlife venues made it a frequent site for "test drives" and unauthorised street racing.

Although the Singapore Police Force (SPF) had conducted periodic enforcement operations in the area, community members described them as temporary deterrents that failed to address the root of the problem. Critics and urban planners pointed to the wide, straight lanes of Tanjong Pagar Road as an infrastructure design that inadvertently encouraged reckless driving. This led to immediate calls for the installation of fixed speed cameras and permanent traffic-calming features to replace the reliance on sporadic police patrols.

== Legal and successive developments ==
In August 2022, State Coroner Adam Nakhoda ruled the deaths as a "traffic-related misadventure." The inquiry revealed that Long had a blood alcohol level of 86 mg per 100 ml, exceeding the legal limit. Alongside Long, every passenger in the car prior to the crash was also drunk. Following the ruling, the families of passengers Yap, Teo, and Wong filed civil claims seeking a combined S$1.7 million from Long's estate. Long's mother, acting as the estate administrator, contested the claims, arguing that the passengers were negligent by choosing to enter the vehicle despite knowing the driver had consumed alcohol.

In April 2023, Phoo Yi Lin, a 26-year-old Malaysian woman who had driven the BMW at high speed earlier that morning, was fined S$5,000 and disqualified from driving for three years. She pleaded guilty to one count of dangerous driving. The court ruled that, while she was not the driver during the crash, her actions contributed to the dangerous environment that morning.

Following the incident, Raybe Oh underwent over 40 surgical procedures and intensive physical therapy. In 2022, Oh appeared in a CNA interview describing her recovery and future plans, stating that she was in the beauty business. In February 2026, she announced her return to the public stage as a getai singer, largely to pay off her school fees and to reduce the burden on her father. On 27 February 2026, she performed a guest set at a show organised by the Zhenghua Community Club in Bukit Panjang, which was attended by her mother and medical staff from the Singapore General Hospital burn unit. Oh continues to serve as a mentor for other burn survivors and remains in close contact with the parents of her late fiancé, stating they treat her as their own daughter.
