= Tanjong Pagar =

Historic district in Singapore

- Subzone of Downtown Core Planning Area

Other transcription(s)
  - Chinese: 丹戎巴葛; Dānróng Bāgě (Pinyin); Tan-jiông Pa-kat (Hokkien POJ)
  - Malay: Tanjung Pagar (Rumi) تنجوڠ ڤاڬر (Jawi)
  - Tamil: தஞ்சோங் பகார் Tañcōṅ Pakār (Transliteration)
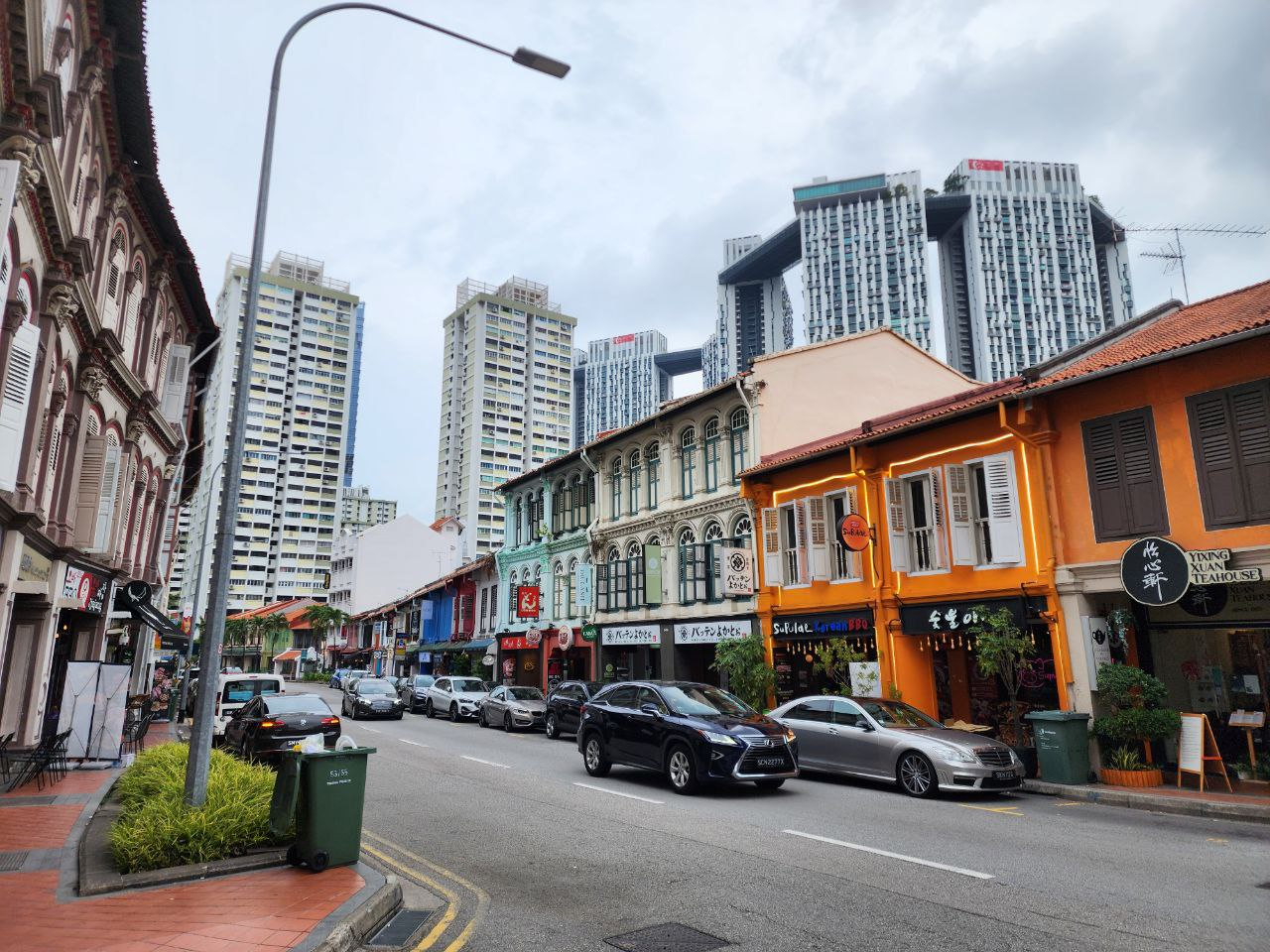
- Tanjong Pagar Road in 2024, with The Pinnacle@Duxton visible in the background.
- Interactive map of Tanjong Pagar

Government
  - Mayor: Central Singapore CDC: Denise Phua
  - Members of Parliament: Jalan Besar GRC: Josephine Teo; Tanjong Pagar GRC: Foo Cexiang

Tanjong Pagar (alternatively spelled Tanjung Pagar) is a historic district located within the Central Business District of Singapore, straddling the Outram Planning Area and the Downtown Core under the Urban Redevelopment Authority's urban planning zones. The district is a popular tourist destination.

The name comes from the Malay language, in which it means "cape of stakes". This is probably from the stakes used by fishermen to secure fish traps, as the village's main economic activity was fishing. Today, the district is a mix of old and new buildings. One prominent landmark in Tanjong Pagar is the Tanjong Pagar railway station. Built in 1932, it ceased operations in 2011. The station, with a distinct art deco style has been repurposed into a museum as well as being the site of Cantonment MRT station, named after Cantonment Road.

Notable landmarks in Tanjong Pagar also include the Thian Hock Keng Temple, which was gazetted as a national monument in 1973. It is one of the oldest temples in Singapore and was built in the early 19th century. There is also the Baba House, a museum showcasing the country's Peranakan history, architecture and heritage. Tanjong Pagar is also known for its local street art. Prominent street art murals are often found on the sides of various shophouses and buildings within the district. There are two public housing estates in Tanjong Pagar, located at Everton Park and Spottiswoode Park; these were built from the 1970s to the 1980s. Tanjong Pagar also contains both the tallest public housing building, the Pinnacle@Duxton, and the tallest building outright, the Guoco Tower, in the country.

In addition to its cultural and architectural landmarks, Tanjong Pagar also has several eateries, from hawker centers such as the Amoy and Maxwell Food Centres to high-end restaurants. Tanjong Pagar has a number of restaurants and stalls with Michelin Bib Gourmand awards. A number of Korean restaurants has also popped up along Tanjong Pagar Road within the last few decades, leading to it being described as the Little Korea of Singapore.

== History ==
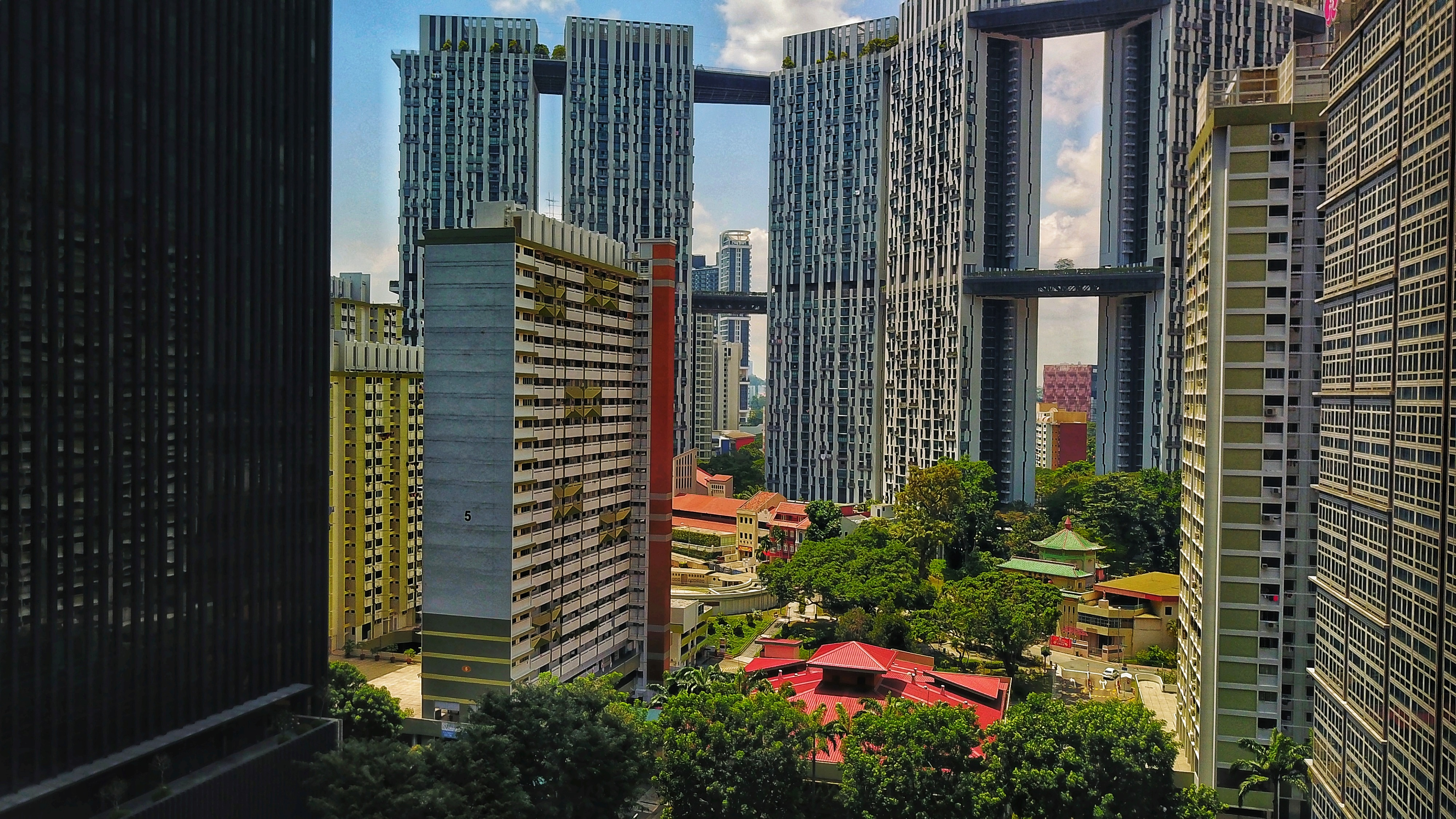
The Tanjong Pagar Housing Estate with the Pinnacle@Duxton in the background

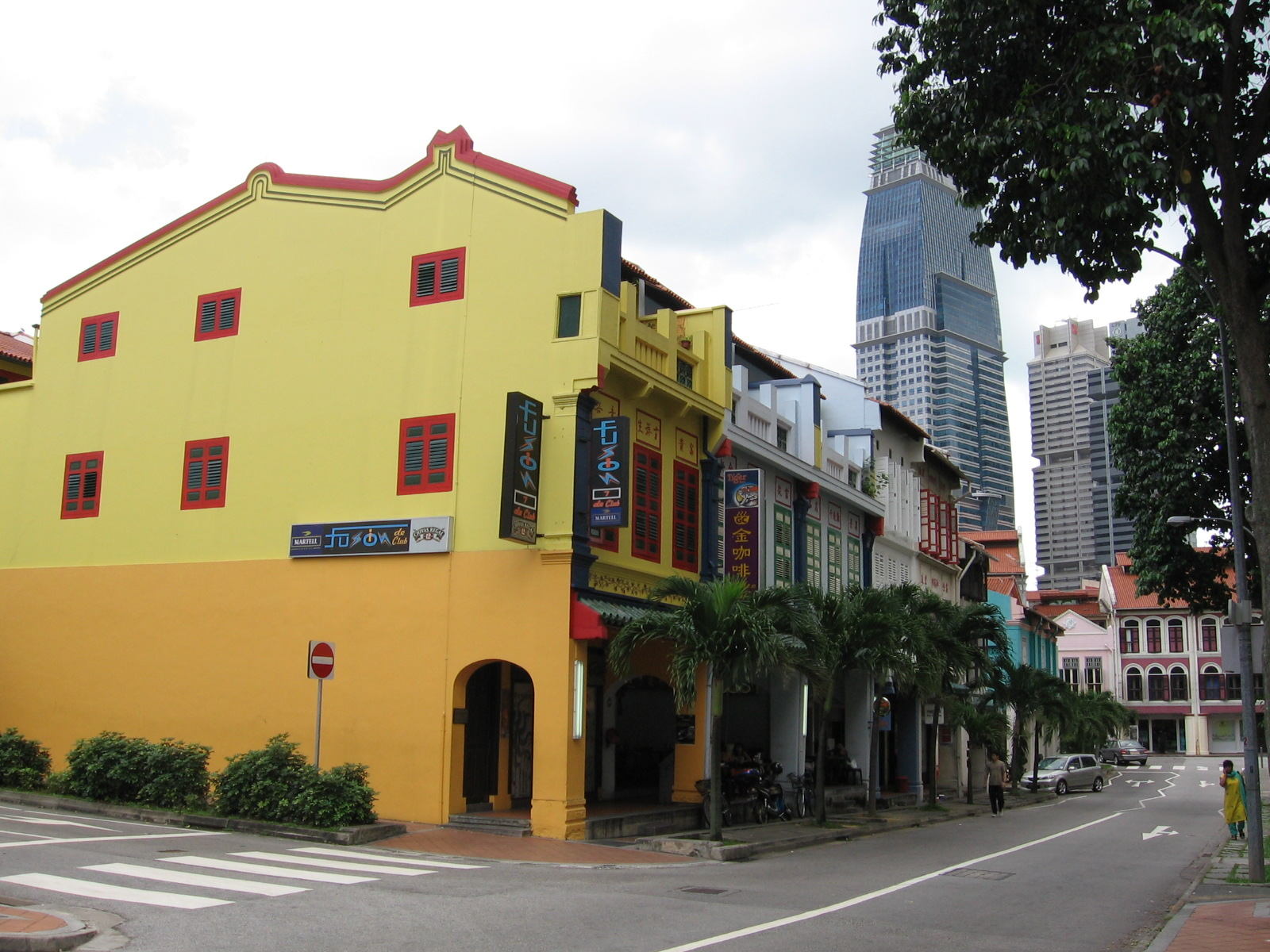
Craig Road is named after Captain J. Craig, a member of the Merchant Service Guild and an officer of the Zetland Lodge, a club.

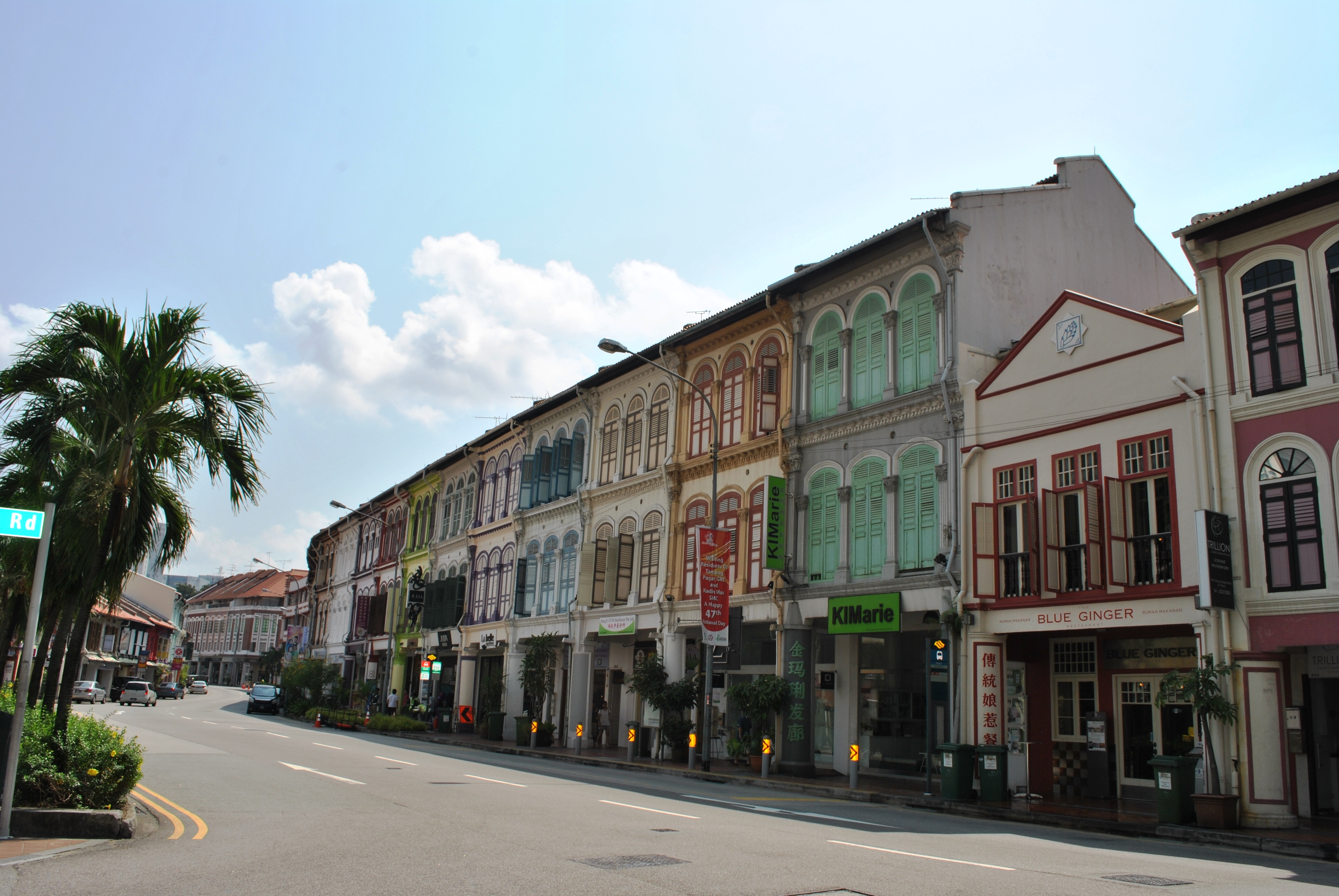
Tanjong Pagar Road in 2012

The area of what Tanjong Pagar is now was said to be initially a fishing village called Salinter.

From the 1600s, Tanjong Pagar, located between the docks and the town, was an enclave for the thousands of Chinese and Indian dock workers who had migrated to Singapore from the mid-19th century.

Tanjong Pagar (Jawi: تنجوڠ ڤاڬر) in Malay means "cape of stakes", possibly due to kelongs (offshore fishing traps constructed using wooden stakes and cross pieces) along the coast from the village of Tanjong Malang till Tanjong Pagar. In George Drumgoole Coleman's 1836 Map of the Town, there is a road, Tanjong Passar, from South Bridge Road to the fishing village and there is a possibility that Tanjong Pagar is a corruption of the Tanjong Passar.

According to the Malay Annals, the villages along the coast of Singapore was constantly attacked by shoals of swordfish. The Sri Maharajah, on the advice of a boy, Hang Nadim, built a defensive structure of banana stems along the coastal side of the villages which trapped the swordfishes as they attacked the villages.

During the 1820s, a man who had unsuccessfully stabbed William Farquhar with a kris, Sayid Yasin, had his corpse placed in chains in an iron cage and exhibited publicly at Tanjong Malang for a fortnight as punishment for the stabbing. His grave later became a shrine and a place of pilgrimage for many years.

In the 1850s, when shipping activities increased, the Tanjong Pagar Dock Company was formed in 1864 along with wharves being built along the coast. This led to the possibly naming the area as Tanjong Pagar where Tanjong means "cape" and pagar means "fence" or enclosed space as the ships are moored in the wharves. Tanjong Pagar likely refer to the general area of PSA Gate 3 near the Victoria Dock.

Tanjong Pagar Road is known as tan jiong pa kat in Hokkien (Min Nan), which is phonetic.

In 2021, Tanjong Pagar Road was the site of a high-speed, single-vehicle collision that resulted in the deaths of all five occupants.

== Points of interest ==
=== Tras Street ===
The street name "Tras Street" dates from an 1898 municipal resolution to "use names of rivers and districts in the Malay Peninsula as being better adapted to the purpose [of naming streets] than the names of persons or families."

Tras Street today is a night spot featuring many pubs, clubs and KTV bars.

=== Cantonment Road ===
Cantonment Road got its name from the contingent of Indian sepoys stationed here in 1819. They had accompanied Sir Stamford Raffles to Singapore and were asked to stay. In India, the English term for permanent military accommodation, as established by the sepoys, is "cantonment".

The local Cantonese had another name for Cantonment Road. They called it Ba Suo Wei, meaning "end of Bukit Pasoh".

Outram Road, which used to be part of Cantonment Road, only became a separate thoroughfare in 1853. The old Chinese name for Outram was Si Pai Po, meaning "sepoy's field", referring to the former sepoy presence in the area during colonial days.

=== Duxton Hill ===
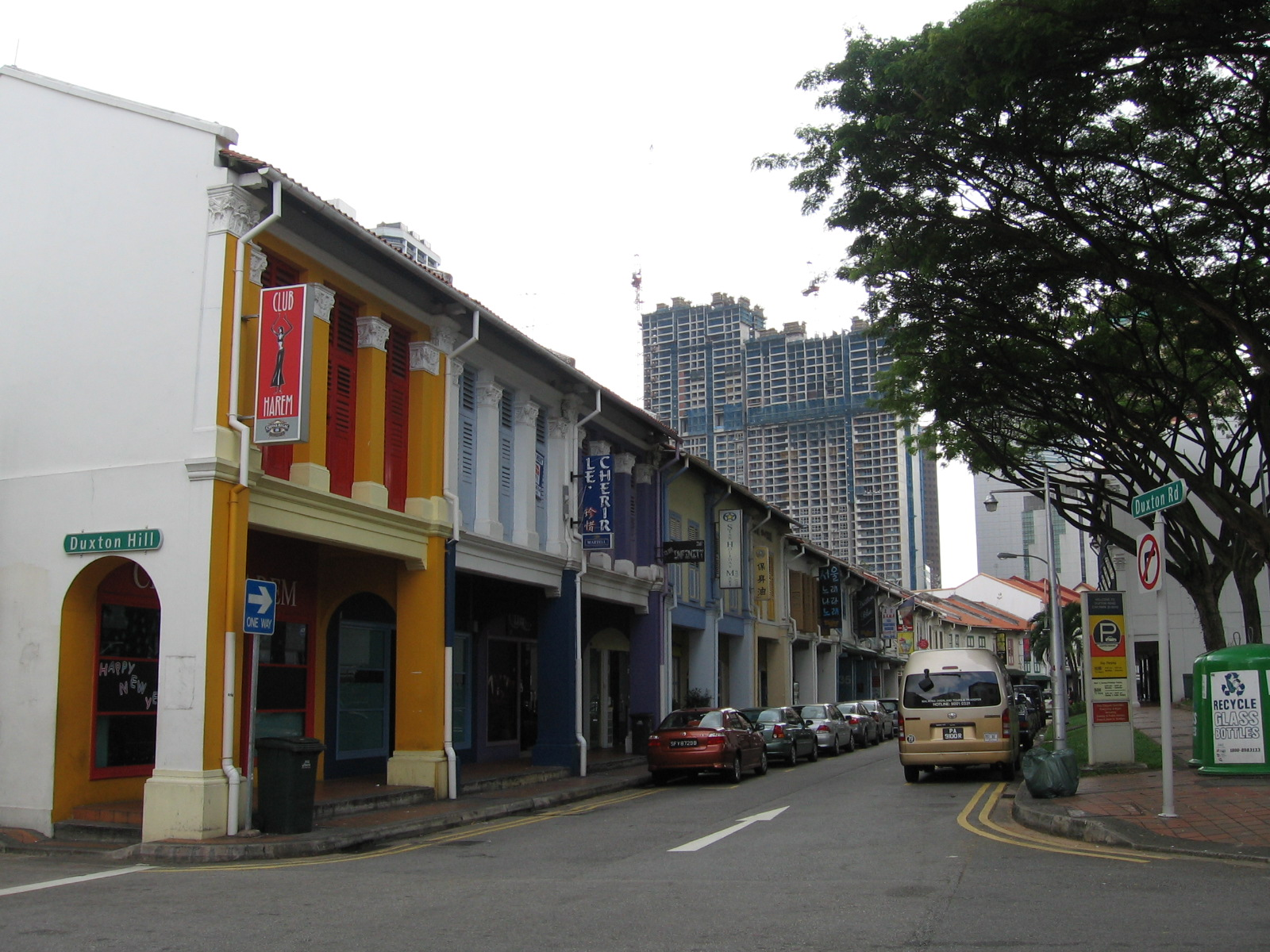
Duxton Hill was the site of a nutmeg plantation owned by Dr J.W. Montgomerie (1797–1856), who was an Assistant Surgeon in the service of the Government.

Dr J.W. Montgomerie, the first owner of Duxton Hill, cultivated nutmeg plantations on its slopes. Montgomerie died in 1856 and his land on Duxton was auctioned off. Fourteen acres went to Arab Syed Abdullah bin Omar Aljunied, who divided them into four lots which were leased to wealthy Chinese developers.

By the 1890s, the developers had built two- and three-storey shophouses in Duxton Hill and the more affluent Chinese moved to the area.

=== Tanjong Pagar Plaza ===
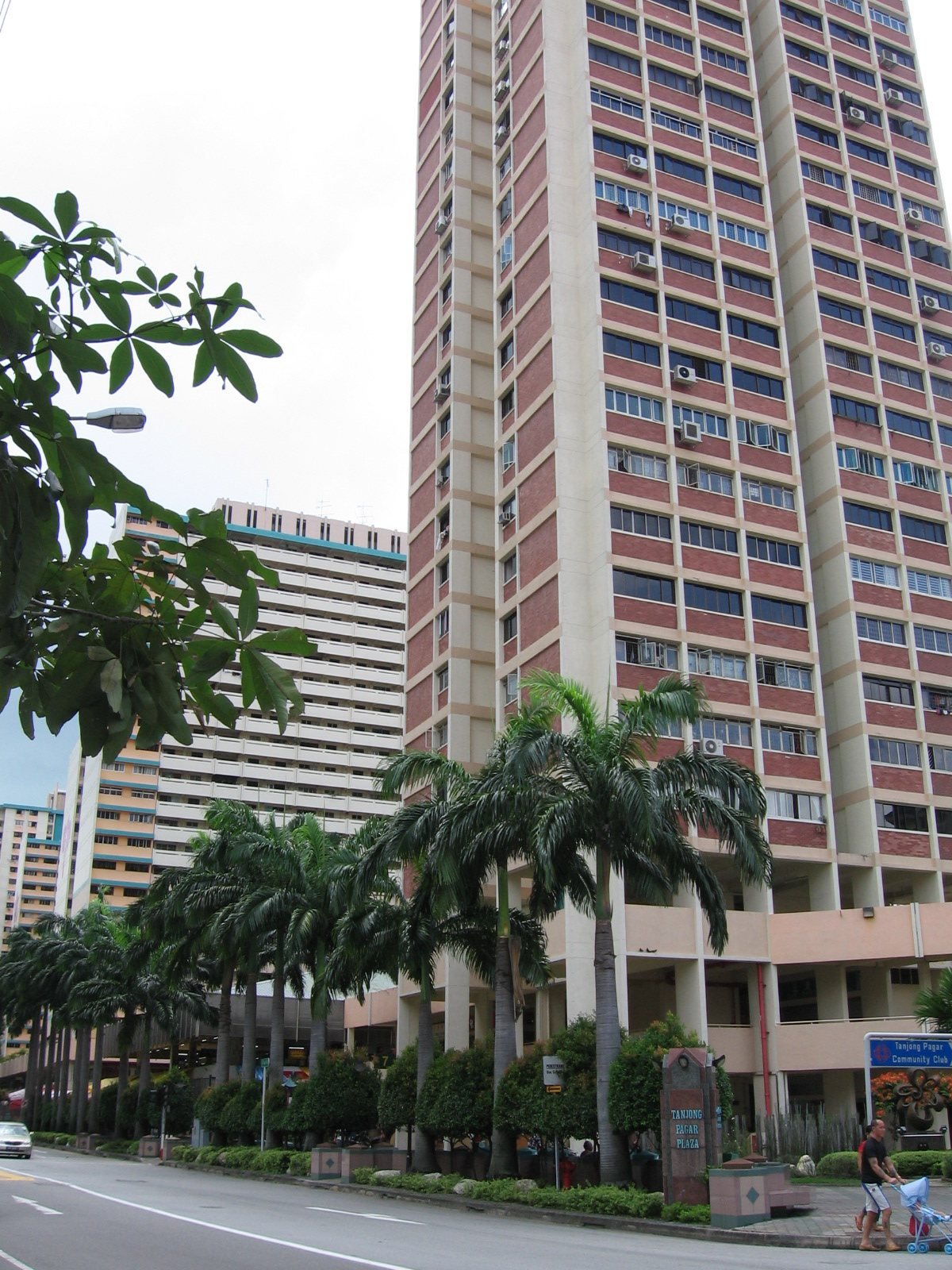
The Tanjong Pagar Plaza is an HDB residential development completed in 1977.

Along the stretch of Tanjong Pagar Road, there is a semi-circle portion of road where it used to be called Cheng Cheok Street. Due to the shape of the road, the Hokkiens called the street gu kak hang, meaning "the ox's horns". The Cheng Cheok Street was named after Khoo Cheng Cheok, who is believed to be the brother of rice merchant Khoo Cheng Tiong who is the president of the Thong Chai Medical Institution.

As the street is the shape of a semi-circle and both ends connected to Tanjong Pagar Road, it was eventually renamed as part of Tanjong Pagar Road. On this stretch, there used to be pre-war shophouses before it was demolished and Tanjong Pagar Plaza, a commercial complex, was built over the original site.

=== Railway transport ===
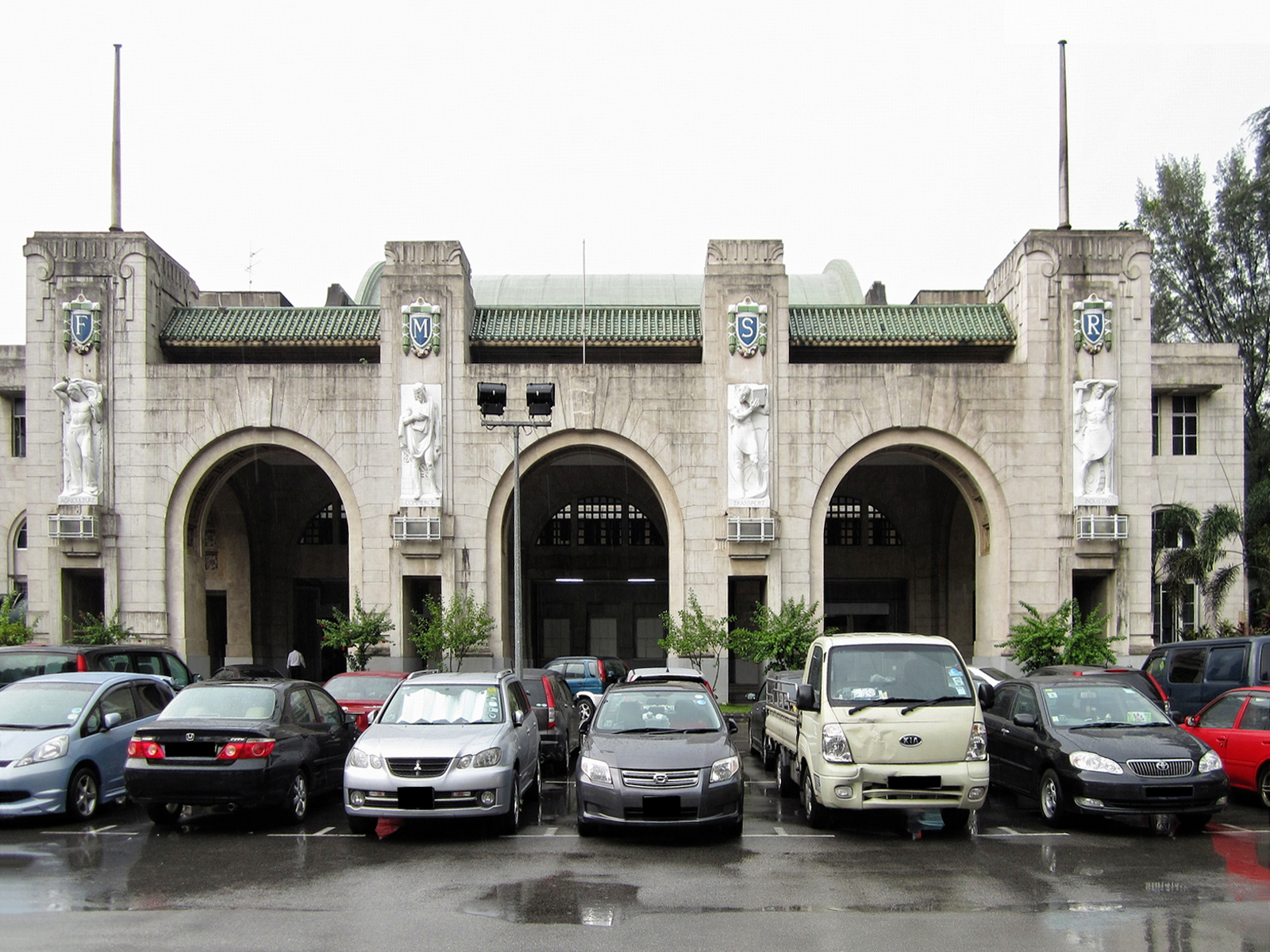
The Tanjong Pagar railway station.

The Malayan railway company (Keretapi Tanah Melayu) ran trains to a terminal railway station here. These trains served other parts of the Malay Peninsula.

The station ceased operations on 1 July 2011. KTM's southern terminus is now at the Woodlands Train Checkpoint near the causeway. The Singaporean government has conserved the Tanjong Pagar railway station building and has integrated it into newer developments on the site, including as a museum as well as being the site of Cantonment MRT station.

=== Amoy Street Food Centre ===
Amoy Street Food Centre is a bustling hawker centre in the area which houses Michelin Bib Gourmand awardees.

=== Maxwell Food Centre ===
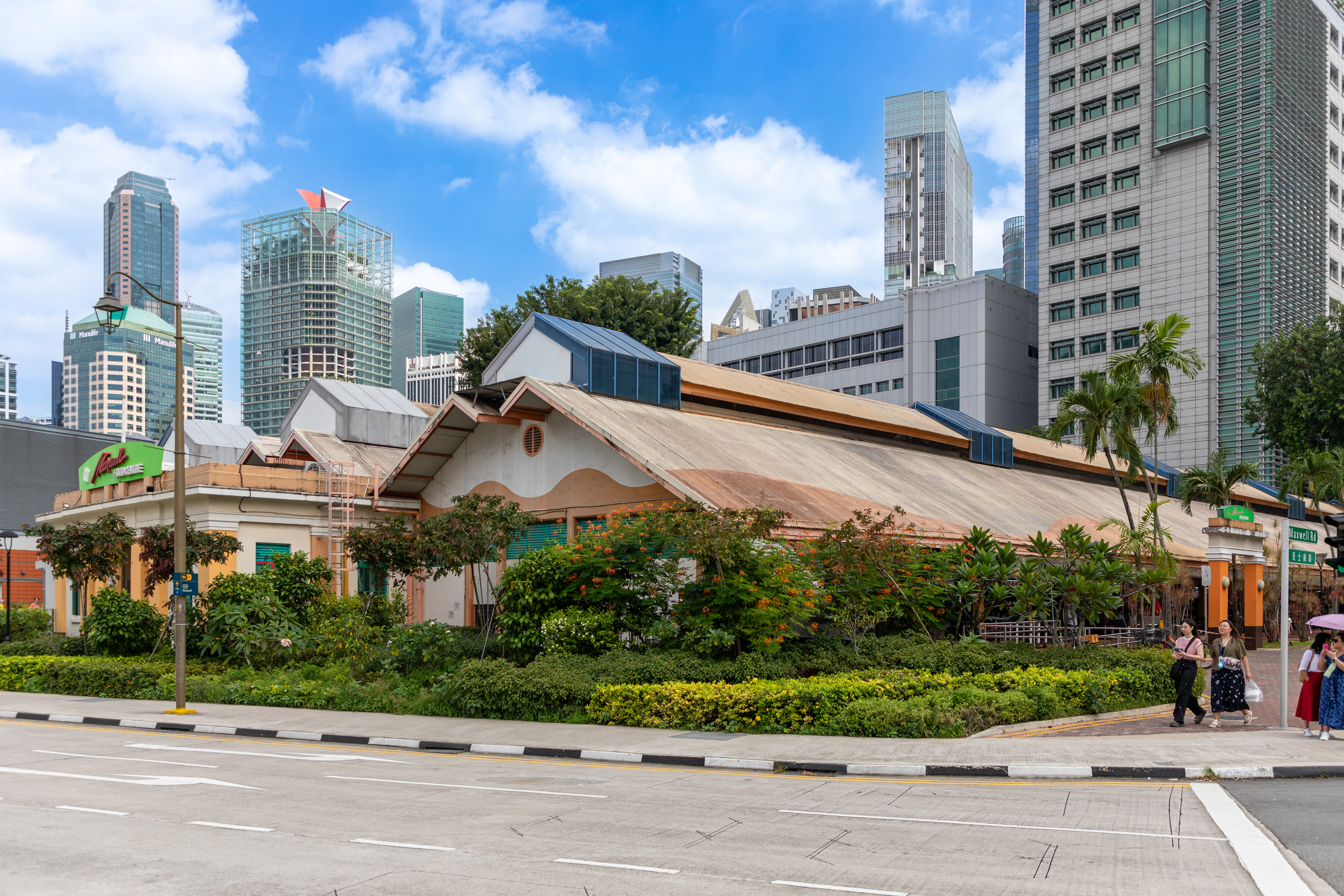
Maxwell Food Centre

The Maxwell Food Centre dates back to pre-war days as a fresh food market and food centre. In 1987, it was converted into a food centre, housing hawkers from the vicinity. The present existing hawker centre was renovated in 2001. Stallholders are mainly those from the essentially Cantonese neighbourhood, with many from the famed food street, China Street. A wide variety of authentic local favourites are available at Maxwell Food Centre, with slight Cantonese bent. Popular dishes include hum chim peng (a crusty fried pancake), ngor hiong or five spices meat roll of Singaporean Hokkien origin, and herbal broths made from home-brewed recipes.

=== Telok Ayer Performing Arts Centre ===
The Telok Ayer Performing Arts Centre (TAPAC) housed arts full-time and part-time groups of different cultural traditions and art disciplines, and had the distinction of being the first property to be acquired under the National Arts Council's Arts Housing Scheme in 1985. It was located at Cecil Street next to Tanjong Pagar MRT station.

=== Little Korea ===
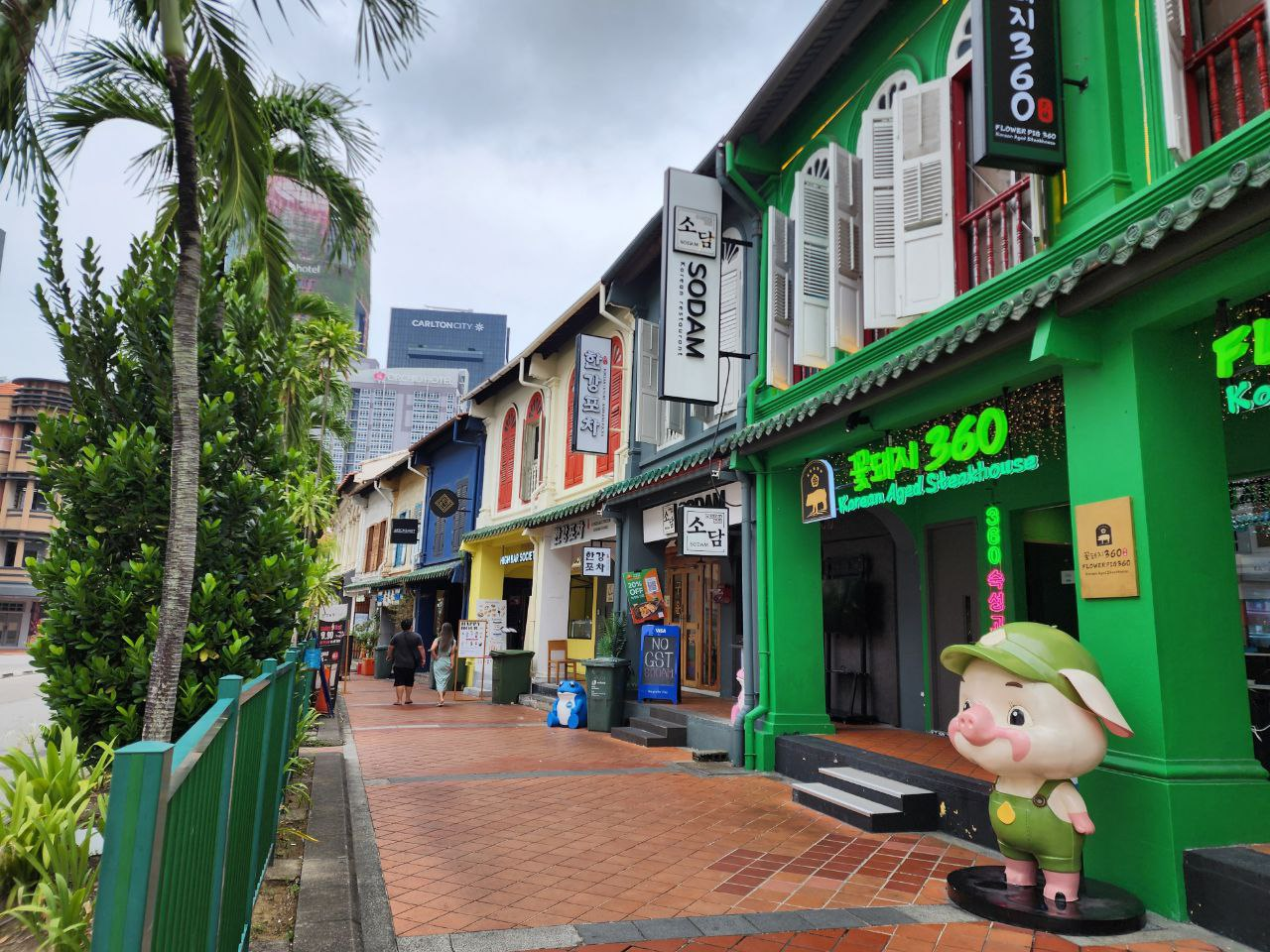
Korean establishments are mainly concentrated in the shophouses along Tanjong Pagar Road.

Tanjong Pagar has been greatly influenced by Korean culture in recent years and has earned the nickname of Little Korea and Koreatown. As many as 15 Korean food outlets have sprung up in a 300 m stretch of Tanjong Pagar Road near Duxton Hill over the last few years. Following the increase in the Korean population, the number of restaurants and retailers aimed at the community is on the rise. Apart from Korean eateries, there are also many wedding boutiques along Tanjong Pagar Road and at least three wedding boutiques there offer Korean-themed wedding photography.

=== AIA Tanjong Pagar ===
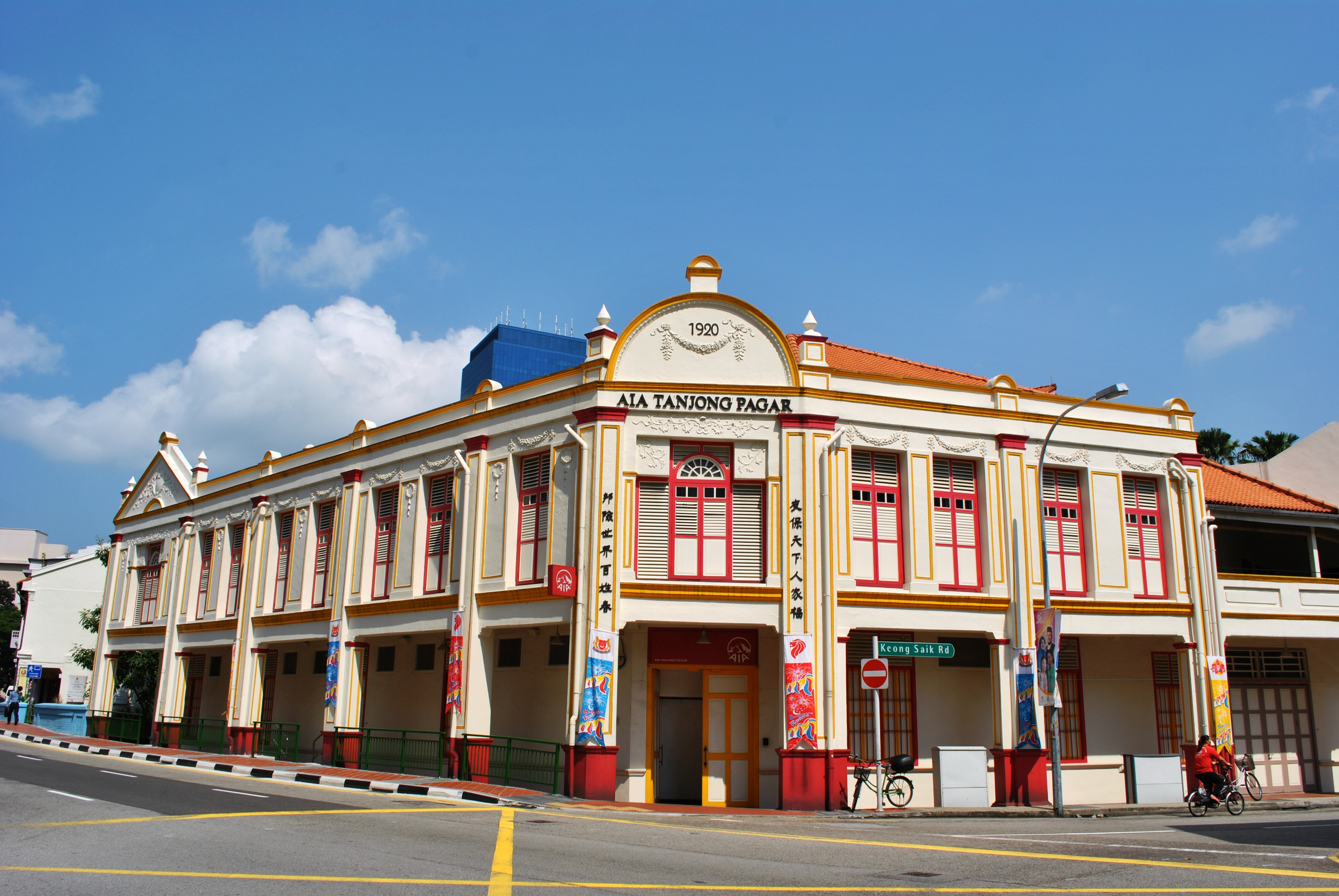
AIA Tanjong Pagar

AIA Tanjong Pagar Building, built in 1920, recently restored to former glory. It is located at the junction between Neil Road and Keong Saik Road. AIA Tanjong Pagar Building houses the "American Insurance Agency".

=== Tanjong Pagar Centre (Guoco Tower) ===
The Tanjong Pagar Centre was completed in 2016 and is the tallest building in Singapore.

=== Mount Palmer ===
Mount Palmer, alternatively known as the Parsi Hill, was a former hill located in Tanjong Pagar. Named after British-Indian merchant John Palmer who formerly owned properties at the top of the hill, Mount Palmer was a thriving prewar Parsi settlement. Much of Mount Palmer was cleared in 1932. However, the only remaining landmarks of Mount Palmer are the Keramat Habib Noh and a Hakka Chinese temple.

== Politics ==
Currently, the entire place is divided between Tanjong Pagar GRC and Jalan Besar GRC. Both of them are under the People's Action Party (PAP).

The western part of Tanjong Pagar is mainly located in the Tanjong Pagar-Tiong Bahru division of Tanjong Pagar GRC. Since the namesake electoral ward was created in 1955, Singapore's founder and inaugural Prime Minister, Lee Kuan Yew, served as its Member of Parliament for about 60 years until his death on 23 March 2015. Currently, Foo Cexiang served as the MP for the division, following Lee's successor Indranee Thurai Rajah, a fellow Tanjong Pagar GRC MP who joined in 2001, departed from the ward in 2025 to helm Pasir Ris-Changi GRC.

The eastern half of the area is also located in the Kreta Ayer-Kim Seng division of Jalan Besar GRC whose MP is Josephine Teo since 2020, replacing Lily Neo. In 2011, Jalan Besar GRC was reorganized to the short-lived Moulmein-Kallang GRC with Kreta Ayer-Kim Seng being ceded to the neighbouring Tanjong Pagar GRC, but these changes has since been reversed in 2015.

== In media ==
- Last Train from Tanjong Pagar, 2014. Epigram Books (Singapore) ISBN 9789810769208, 9810769202
- Singapore Shophouse Walks: Chinatown, Blair Plain, Duxton Hill, Tanjong Pagar. Kildi Photo (Singapore) ISBN 9789811436406, 9811436401
