= Baba House =

Historic house in Singapore

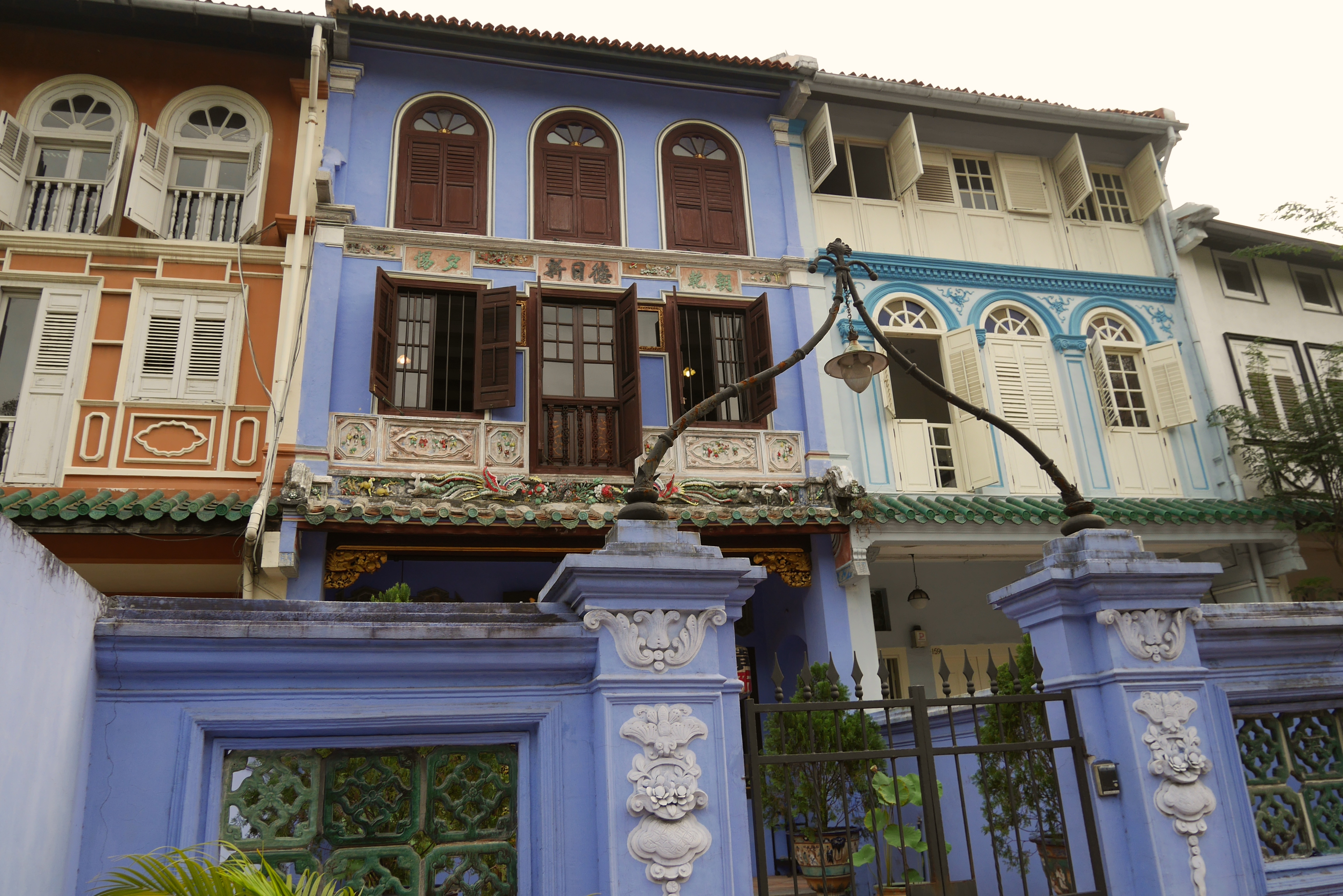
- NUS Baba House in 2014
- Established: 4 September 2008; 17 years ago
- Location: 157 Neil Road (1°16′37″N 103°50′14.32″E); Singapore 088883
- Type: Peranakan Heritage
- Director: Mrs Christine Khor
- Curators: Foo Su Ling; Peter Lee
- Public transit access: EW16 NE3 TE17 Outram Park (1°16′50″N 103°50′22″E); Singapore

Baba House (also referred to as NUS Baba House) is a museum in Singapore, showcasing Peranakan history, architecture and heritage. It is a traditional Peranakan pre-war terrace-house on Neil Road which was formerly owned by the family of a 19th-century shipping tycoon Wee Bin who settled in Singapore, after arriving from the southern Chinese province of Fujian. The Baba House is also an outpost of the National University of Singapore (NUS) Museum and co-managed by the NUS Centre for the Arts.

== History ==
Built in the 1890s, 157 Neil Road is a residential terrace house located in the Residential Historic District of Blair Plain. The house and the surrounding area was gazetted for conservation by the Urban Redevelopment Authority of Singapore, in 1991.

In April 2005, a S$4 million donation was made to the National University of Singapore (NUS) by Ms Agnes Tan, the last surviving daughter of the founder of the Malaysian Chinese Association (MCA), the late Tun Tan Cheng Lock. This donation was given to the university to acquire the Wee family's traditional Peranakan house along Neil Road.

The house came into the Wee Family in 1910 when a matriarch of the family bought the house for her grandson, Wee Eng Cheng.

The house was last owned and managed by Mr Wee Lin, the sixth-generation descendant of Wee Bin.
Another donation of S$1.5 million was made to the university, for acquisition of two other shophouses along Jalan Tun Tan Cheng Lock in Malacca. These acquired houses will be restored and used for educating younger generations about Peranakan history, culture and architecture, while the two houses in Malacca to be used for study on conservation techniques of historical buildings. In gesture of appreciation for the donation, the university named the Singapore house as the Tan Cheng Lock Baba House.

The House was officially opened by President of Singapore Mr S R Nathan on September 4, 2008, as the Baba House, and opened to the public on September 15, 2008. Staff and students from NUS' School of Design and Architecture and the Faculty of Arts and Social Sciences' South-east Asia Studies Programme were involved in the restoration, which has elaborate and intricately carved wooden windows, doors and partition screens. About 70 per cent of the furniture in the House belonged to the Wee estate, while the rest of the items were acquired from Peranakan families in Singapore and Malacca. The first two storeys of the House showcase the Peranakan domestic interior, while artists showcase modern interpretations of Peranakan culture through the exhibition gallery on the third storey. At the same time, the House will also be a venue for Peranakan culinary and craft workshops to be organized by the NUS Museum.

== Display ==
In contrast to the Peranakan Museum, the Baba House enables visitors to experience more intimately how typical Peranakan homes looked and functioned in the 1920s, the Golden Era of Peranakan culture in Singapore. It is a showcase of lavishly carved antique furniture and items used by Chinese Peranakans of that time.

The venue may be booked for culturally relevant events as part of the experience-making process.

The House can be visited by appointment only and bookings to join the weekly guided tours (limited to 14 people per tour) can be made through the NUS Museum.

== See also ==
- NUS Museum
- Peranakan Museum
- 141 Neil Road – another conserved building along Neil Road, also owned by NUS
