= 裕華 =

裕華 or 裕华, meaning 'wealthy, luxury', may refer to:

- Yue Hwa Building, a historic building in Hong Kong
- Yue Hwa Chinese Products Emporium, a retail company in Hong Kong
- Yuhua, Shijiazhuang, the province of Hebei, China
- Yuhua, Singapore
- Yuka, a feminine name for Yūka Asai (浅井 裕華, born 2003)

== See also ==
- Yuhua (disambiguation)
- Yuka (disambiguation)
