= The Majestic, Singapore =

Coordinates: 1.284722°N 103.843167°E

The Majestic
- 大华戏院
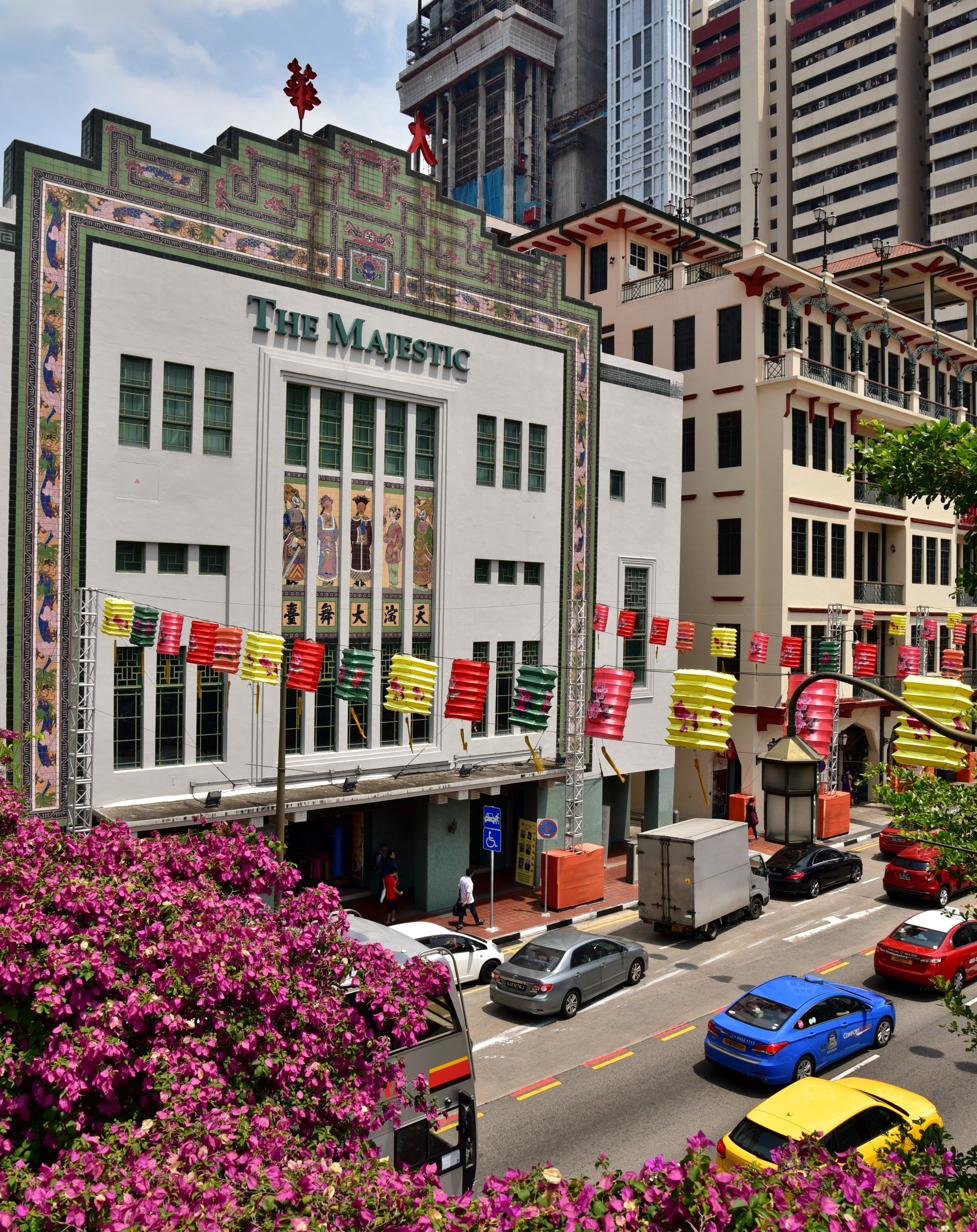
- The Majestic in October 2018

- Location within Singapore
- Former names: Tien Yien Moh Toi Theatre; Queen's Theatre; Tai Hwa Opera House; Majestic Theatre

General information
- Status: Completed
- Type: Commercial
- Classification: M
- Location: Chinatown, Singapore, 80 Eu Tong Sen Street, Singapore 059810, Singapore
- Current tenants: Shaw Organisation (former); The Majestic Film Company (former)
- Named for: The Majestic Film Company
- Construction started: 1927
- Completed: 1928
- Owner: Eu Tong Sen (former); Cathay Realty
- Operator: Cathay Realty

Technical details
- Floor count: 3

The Majestic (Chinese: 大华戏院; pinyin: Dàhuá xìyuàn) is a historic building on Eu Tong Sen Street in Chinatown, Singapore next to Chinatown MRT station. Located between the People's Park Complex and Yue Hwa Building, it was known as Majestic Theatre, which was a Cantonese opera house.

== History ==
=== Early history ===
In 1927, Eu Tong Sen, a tin mining and rubber magnate, built a Cantonese opera house for his wife who was a Cantonese opera fan. The theatre was initially known as Tien Yien Moh Toi Theatre (天演舞台). Eu also formed an opera troupe for her, and bought the street on which the theatre sat, naming it Eu Tong Sen Street.

The building was designed by Swan and Maclaren, the leading architectural firm at that time which also designed Raffles Hotel and Victoria Memorial Hall. The theatre was completed in 1928.

The theatre was a venue for Cantonese opera until 1938, when it was converted into a cinema. The Shaw Brothers rented the place, renamed it the Queen's Theatre, and used it to screen the latest Cantonese blockbuster films.

During the Japanese occupation of Singapore in World War II, the theatre was renamed Tai Hwa Opera House when the Imperial Japanese Army took control of it. It was used to screen Japanese propaganda films.

=== Post-war years ===
Shortly after the Japanese occupation ended in 1945, the Shaw Brothers' lease over the theatre also ended in September the same year. It was then tenanted to The Majestic Film Company, which gave the theatre its current name.

In 1956, Dato Loke Wan Tho of Cathay Organisation with two partners, Wong Siew Leng and Teo Cheng Hay, bought the Majestic Theatre for S$1.1 million from the Eu family. During the 1950s and 1960s, the theatre was not only popular among the locals but also attracted film stars from Hong Kong such as Grace Chang and Lin Dai.

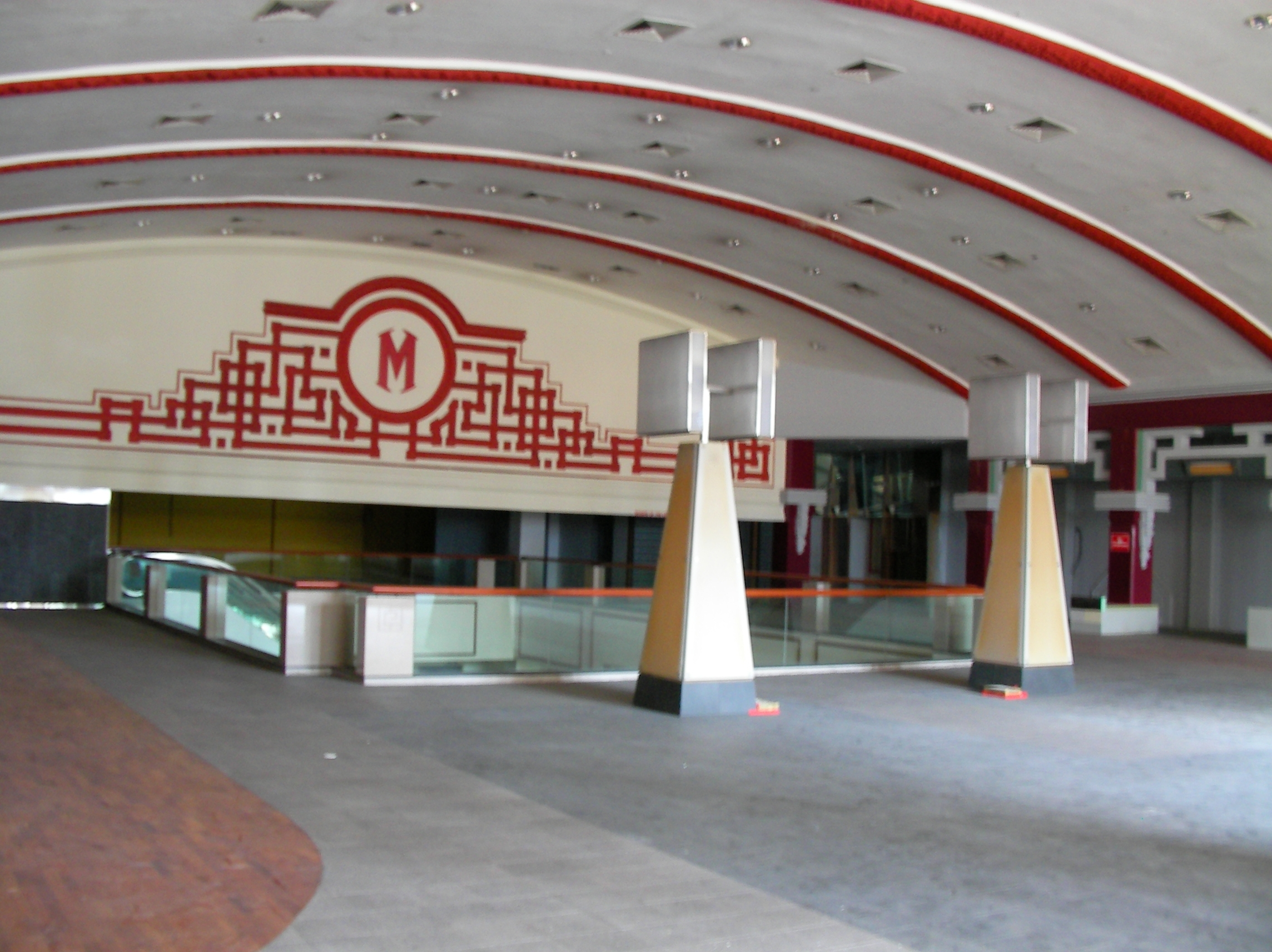
The Majestic

In 1983, the Cathay Organisation became the sole owner after they bought out the partnership. The theatre continued screening Chinese films until 1998 when it was closed.

=== Redevelopment ===
In the early 2000s, the Majestic Theatre was renovated at a cost of S$8 million into a three-story shopping mall. The conservation building was then renamed The Majestic, and was opened on 17 January 2003.

In July 2007, Cathay Realty, the real estate subsidiary of the Cathay Organisation, put The Majestic up for sale at an estimated S$43 million.

== Architecture ==
The Majestic is one of the prominent landmarks in Chinatown, and the theatre was once the grandest building there. The building is a mixture of Western and Chinese architectural styles.

The facade of the theatre is decorated with tiles depicting Cantonese opera scenes, and shiny and colourful mosaic which show flying dragons with heads and tails connected. The theatre was built to accommodate a seating capacity of 1,194. The opera house was a cavernous hallway with a huge domed ceiling, below which there is a logo of the letter "M" for "Majestic".
