= Telok Ayer MRT station =

Mass Rapid Transit station in Singapore

Telok Ayer DT18 直落亚逸 தெலுக் ஆயர்
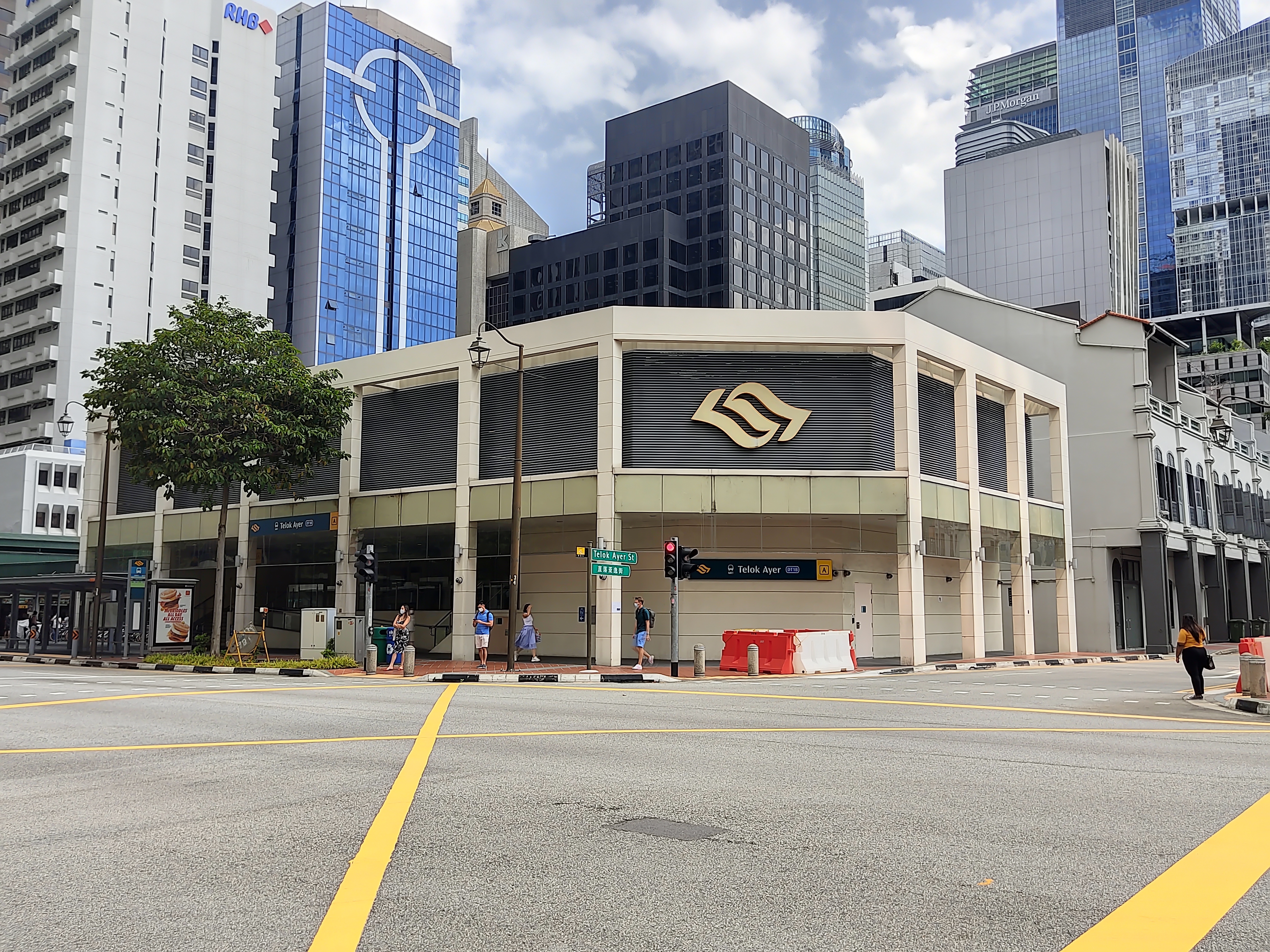
- Exit A of Telok Ayer MRT station.

General information
- Location: 7 Cross Street, Singapore 048416
- Coordinates: 01°16′56″N 103°50′54″E
- System: Mass Rapid Transit (MRT) station
- Owner: Land Transport Authority
- Operator: SBS Transit
- Line: Downtown Line
- Platforms: 2 (2 side platforms)
- Tracks: 2
- Connections: NE4 DT19 Chinatown; NS26 EW14 Raffles Place; Bus, Taxi

Construction
- Structure type: Underground
- Platform levels: 1
- Cycle facilities: Yes
- Accessible: Yes

Other information
- Station code: TLA

History
- Opened: 22 December 2013; 12 years ago
- Former names: Cross Street

Passengers
- June 2024: 12,776 per day

Services
Preceding station	Mass Rapid Transit	Following station
Downtown towards Bukit Panjang	Downtown Line	Chinatown towards Expo
Track layout
Location
- Location within Singapore Rail central area

Telok Ayer MRT station (IPA: /ˈtəloʊk ˌɑː(j)ɛər, -ˌɑː(j)eɪ/ TUH-lohk AH-yair or TUH-lohk AH-yay) is an underground Mass Rapid Transit (MRT) station on the Downtown Line (DTL). Situated in Outram, Singapore, the station serves various offices and commercial developments around the junction of Cross Street and Telok Ayer Street. The station is operated by SBS Transit.

First announced as Cross Street in 2005 as part of the Circle Line's Downtown Extension (DTE), constructing the station required diverting the traffic on Cross Street to a temporary viaduct while building the DTL tunnels above the operational East–West Line (EWL) tunnels. The station, which opened in 2013 along with the DTL Stage 1 stations, features an Art-in-Transit artwork Charm of Bay by Lim Shing Ee.

== History ==
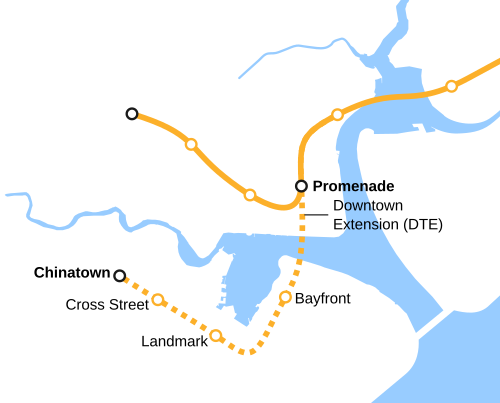
The original Downtown Extension (DTE) from Promenade to Chinatown

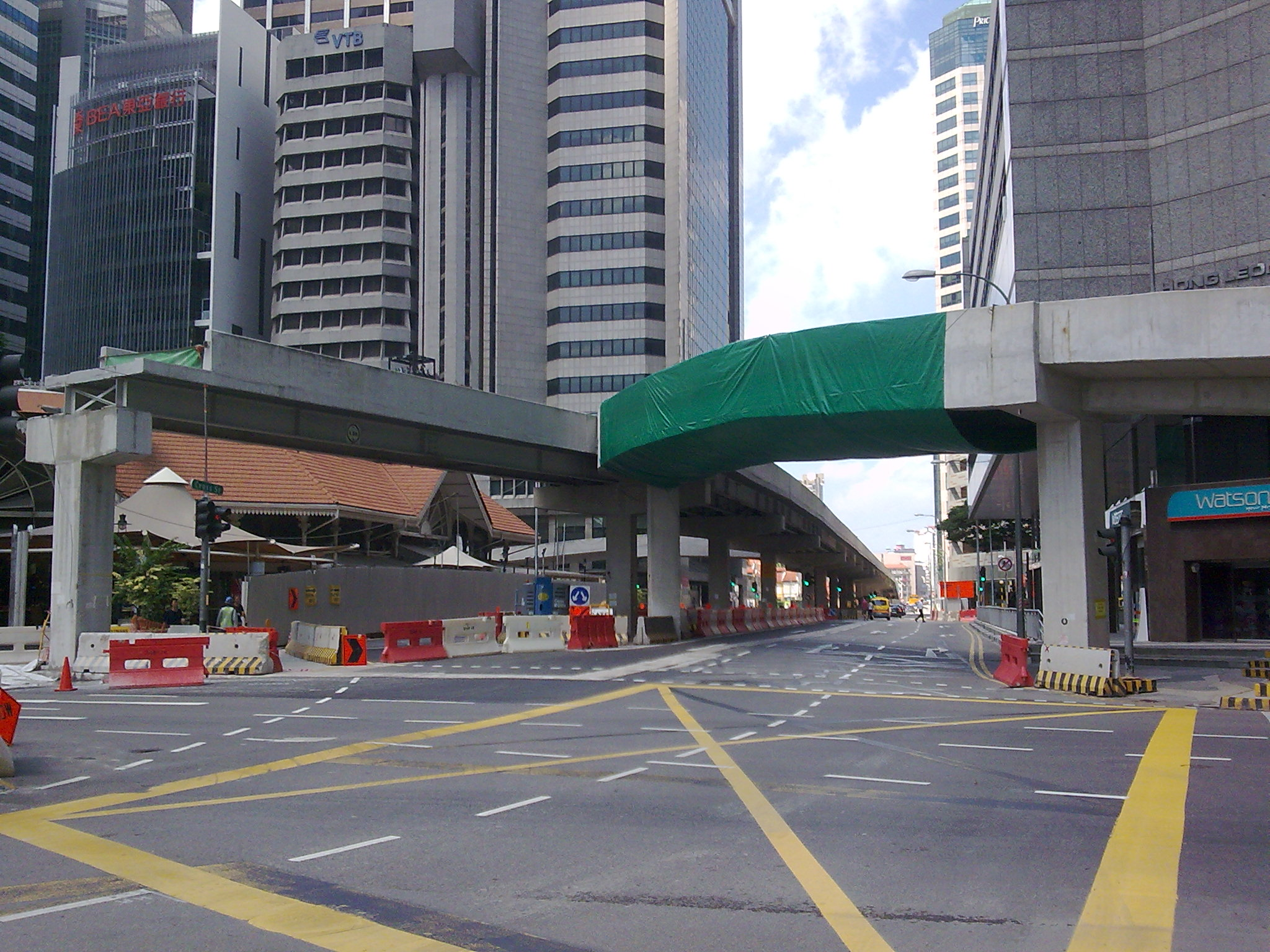
The temporary viaduct built during the station's construction in December 2010

The station was first announced as Cross Street station when the Land Transport Authority (LTA) unveiled the 3.4-kilometre (2.1-mile) Downtown extension (DTE) on 14 June 2005. The DTE was initially planned to be a branch of the Circle Line that would extend from Milennia (now Promenade) station to Chinatown station. In 2007, the DTE was revised to be the first stage of the 40-kilometre (25-mile) Downtown Line (DTL). Contract 908 for the construction of Cross Street station and associated tunnels was awarded to a joint venture between Samsung Corporation and Soletanche Bachy France at a contract sum of S$224.9 million (US$151.47 million) in August 2007. Through a public poll, the station was renamed to Telok Ayer in June 2009.

During the station's construction, a temporary viaduct was built along Cross Street. The two-lane 407-metre (1,335 ft) bridge, which ran between Central Boulevard and China Street, was constructed to replace the closed lanes that had to make way for the station's construction. Work on the viaduct began on 3 February 2008 and it opened for traffic on 28 December that year. Three subsequent ramps to the viaduct were opened over the course from February to April 2009.

The DTL tunnels to the station had to be constructed right above the operational East–West Line (EWL) tunnels. To minimise any upward movement of the EWL tunnels, cement was pumped into the soft soil to strengthen it, while structures such as hydraulic jacks and interlocking pipes were installed above the tunnels. The steel pipes for the DTL tunnels' foundation had to be cautiously positioned to avoid any damage to the EWL tunnels. To address the poor ground conditions at the site during excavation, the diaphragm walls adopted the “Trouser Legs” concept which allowed the walls to reach the harder soil at deeper depths, functioning as both as earth–retaining and foundation elements.

Additionally, the LTA engaged with businesses that were affected by the construction. With the assistance of the LTA, four businesses along Telok Ayer Street had to be relocated to other premises as the construction barriers would impact their visibility and business. Before returning the shops to their owners upon the station's completion, the LTA repaired any minor damage the shops has incurred during the construction. The businesses were grateful for the LTA's assistance during the relocation. To address the noise and dust issue raised by an Indian restaurant along that street, the LTA lined the construction site with large yellow palms that enhanced the area's greenery while mitigating the noise and dust from the construction.

On 29 August 2012, then Transport Minister Lui Tuck Yew visited and inspected the station site, where he announced the alignment of the Thomson Line. The station held an open house on 7 December 2013, with surrounding businesses marking the event by giving various offers to patrons. Telok Ayer station commenced operations on 22 December along with the DTL Stage 1 stations. As part of LTA's review of the DTL station Tamil names to make them phonetically closer to the English names, Telok Ayer's Tamil name was amended in 2016.

== Station details ==
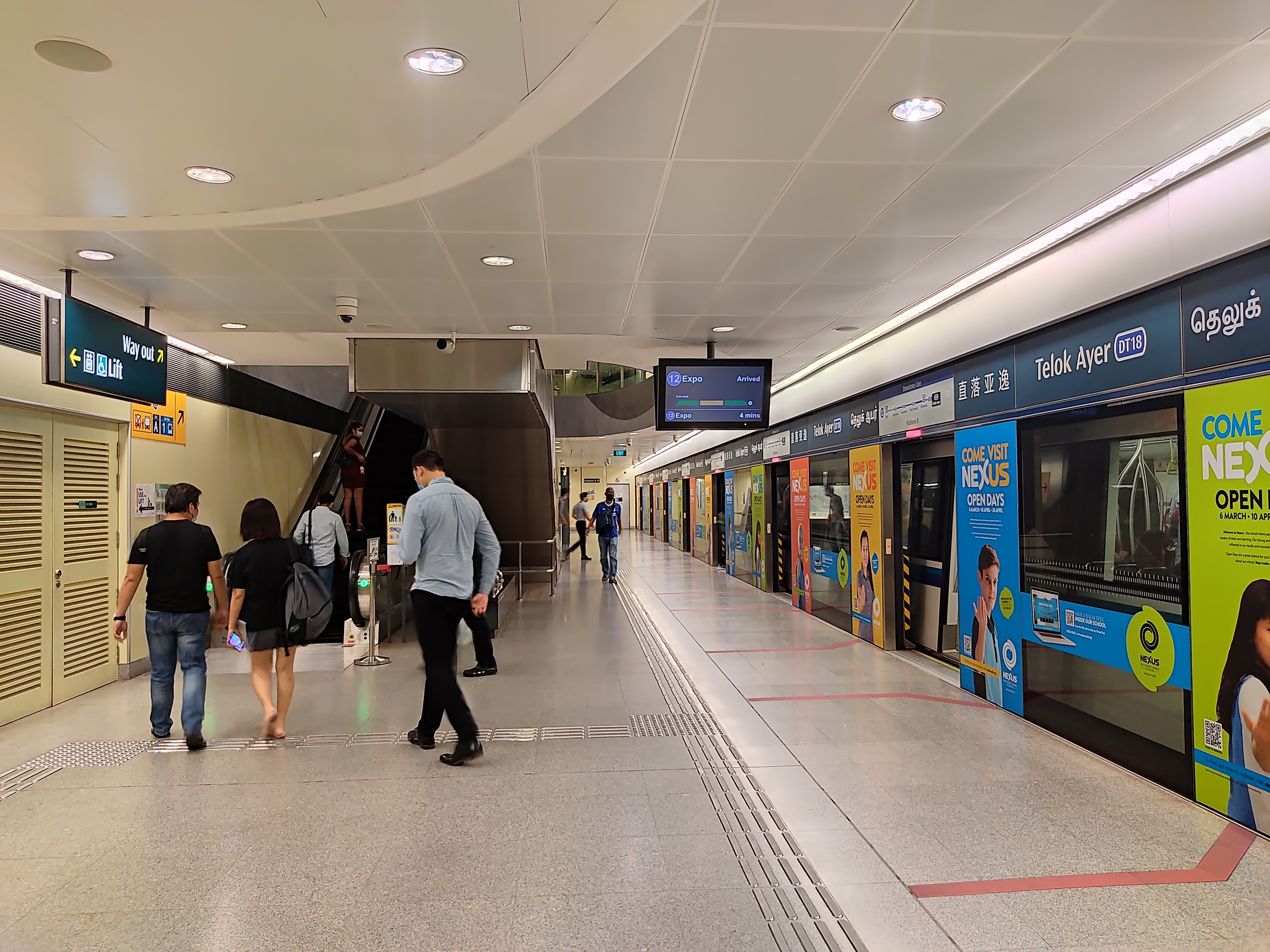
Platform B of the station

Telok Ayer station serves the DTL and is situated between the Downtown and Chinatown stations. The official station code is DT18. Being part of the DTL, the station is operated by SBS Transit. The station is located underneath Cross Street and Telok Ayer Street and is close to several developments including the Far East Bank Building, RHB Building, Prudential Tower and PWC Building, while serving religious and cultural sites such as Lau Pa Sat Festival Market, Nagore Dargah India Muslim Heritage Centre and the Thian Hock Keng Temple. Telok Ayer station is within walking distance to Raffles Place station on the North–South and East–West lines. It was planned to connect the station with the adjacent Chinatown station via an underground retail link. The link was completed in February 2026, between Chinatown DTL exit H and Telok Ayer exit E via ICON Link@Club Street.

Designed by Ong&Ong, durable and easily maintained material and lighting are adopted to ensure the functionality of the station's modern design. The above-ground station structures, while contemporary in design, is intended to blend with the other shophouses in the area. The station features elliptical patterns and shapes used on various facilities, including the lifts, the supporting structures and the curved ceiling. These patterns are intended to act as wayfinding elements for commuters.

=== Artwork ===
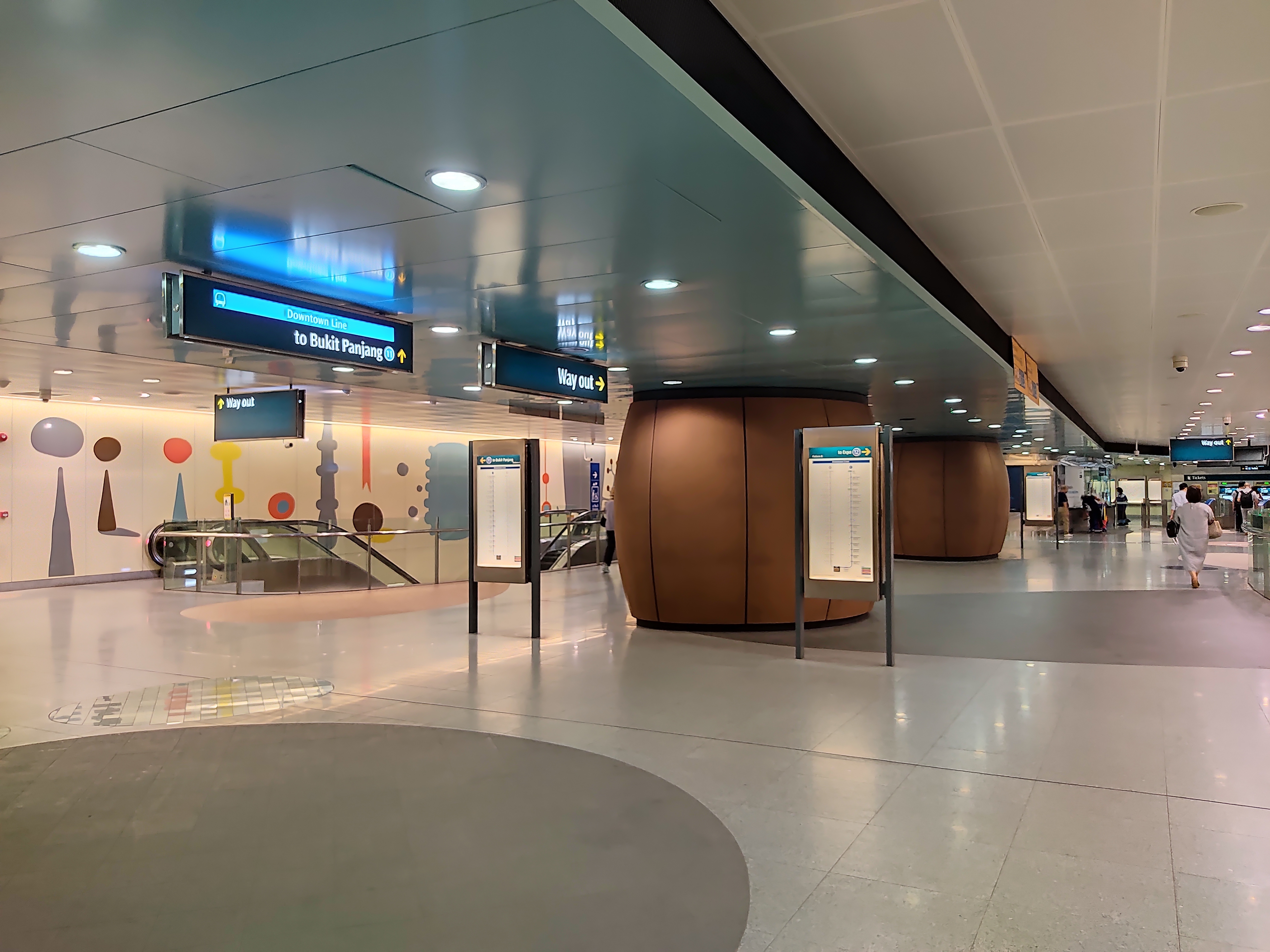
The station concourse level featuring the artwork

Commissioned as part of the Art-in-Transit (AiT) programme — a public art showcase which integrates artworks into the MRT network — Charm of Bay (also named Bulbous Abode) by Lim Shing Ee is displayed at the concourse level of the station. The artwork, which consists of the wall patterns, floor tiles and the station columns, creates a "whimsical landscape" at the concourse level. Each of the concourse's "bulbous" boulder-like columns, cladded in brown, resembles "primitive monuments" such as pebbles and boulders in rivers to reflect the locality's role as the primary settling point of early Chinese immigrants. The boulders cast artificial shadows on the station floor (with darker coloured floor tiles) intended to "map" the commuter traffic as people passes through these rounded spaces.

The abstract patterns on the two opposing walls were inspired by former plantations in the area, along with elements of water and man-made landscapes. These patterns intend to reflect Telok Ayer's history and name, which means "Bay Water" in the Malay language. Each of the figures seem to be related or directed towards the next, as though passing down stories of the past to the next generation. The artwork figures were produced by PolyVision Ceramic Steel using screen printing on durable panels, ensuring that the artwork does not fade.

The artwork project required collaboration with the station's contractors and architects and was one of Lim's (and her partner Kazunori Takeishi's) first major public projects. The work was well received by other AiT artists. Erzan Adam, the artist for the artwork at Farrer Park station, remarked that the work offered an "upbeat, quirky" interpretation of the locality's history, while Yek Wong, the artist for the artwork at one-north station, "loved" the artwork's "quirky" pop references with its "fresh colours".
