= Chinatown MRT station =

Mass Rapid Transit station in Singapore

Chinatown NE4 DT19 牛车水 சைனாடவுன்
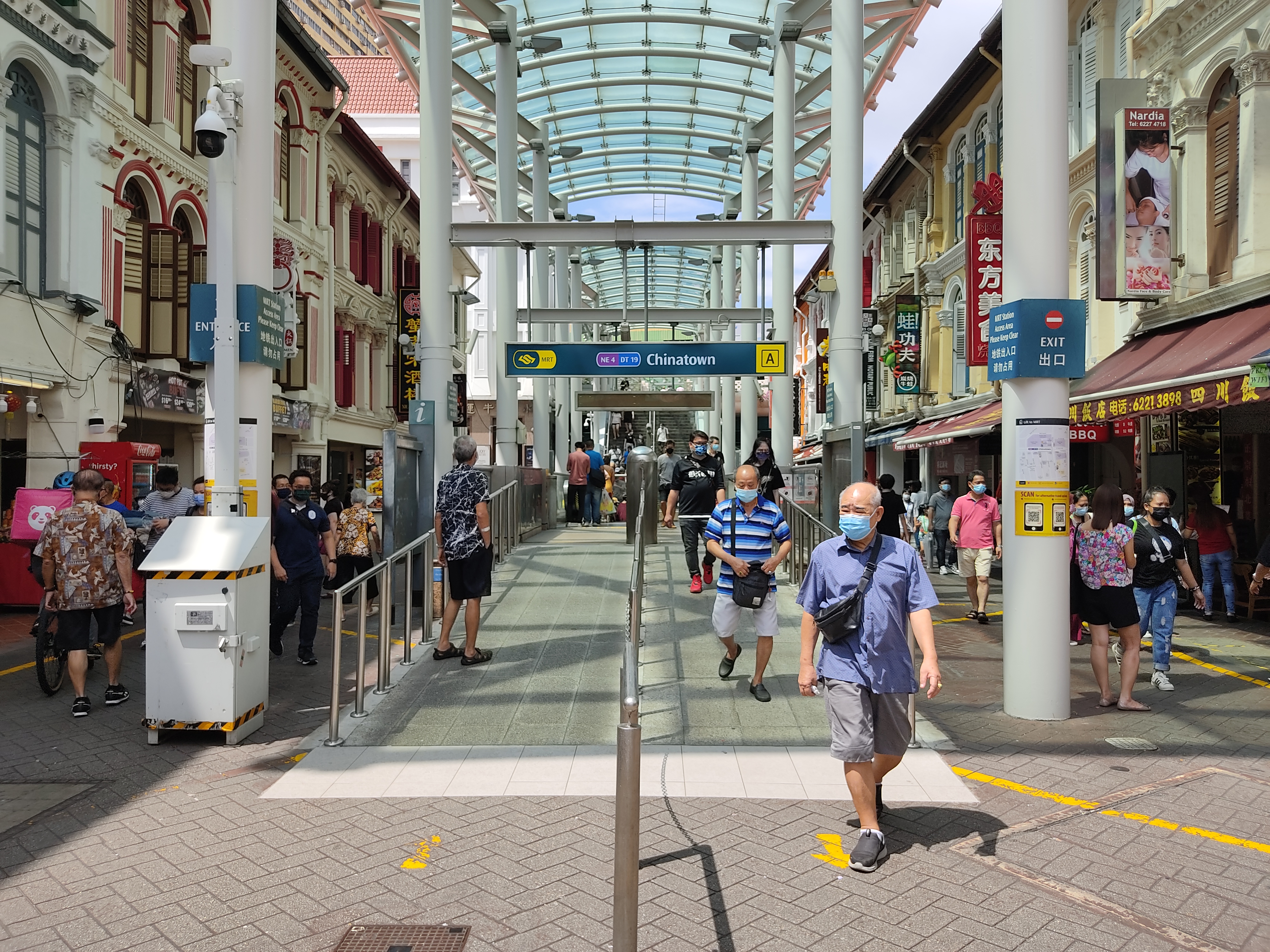
- Exit A of Chinatown MRT station

General information
- Location: 151 New Bridge Road, Singapore 059443 (NEL); 91 Upper Cross Street, Singapore 058362 (DTL)
- Coordinates: 01°17′06″N 103°50′38″E
- System: Mass Rapid Transit (MRT) interchange
- Owner: Land Transport Authority
- Operator: SBS Transit
- Line: North East Line Downtown Line
- Platforms: 4 (1 island platform, 2 side platforms)
- Tracks: 4
- Connections: DT18 Telok Ayer; Bus, Taxi

Construction
- Structure type: Underground
- Platform levels: 2
- Parking: Yes (Chinatown Point, People's Park Centre, People's Park Complex)
- Accessible: Yes
- Architect: RSP Architects Planners & Engineers Pte Ltd. (North East Line)

History
- Opened: 20 June 2003; 23 years ago (North East Line); 22 December 2013; 12 years ago (Downtown Line)
- Former names: People's Park

Passengers
- June 2024: 46,198 per day

Services
Preceding station	Mass Rapid Transit	Following station
Outram Park towards HarbourFront	North East Line	Clarke Quay towards Punggol Coast
Telok Ayer towards Bukit Panjang	Downtown Line	Fort Canning towards Expo
Track layout
Location
- Location within Singapore Rail central area

Chinatown MRT station is an underground Mass Rapid Transit (MRT) interchange station on the North East (NEL) and Downtown (DTL) lines in Outram, Singapore. It serves the ethnic enclave of Chinatown. Situated at the junction of Eu Tong Sen Street, New Bridge Road and Upper Cross Street, the station is near several landmarks, including the Buddha Tooth Relic Temple, Masjid Jamae (Chulia), Chinatown Point and People's Park Complex.

First announced as People's Park in March 1996, the NEL station was one of the most challenging projects undertaken during that line's construction. It involved multiple diversions of the main roads and the Eu Tong Sen Canal, in addition to the preservation of the Garden Bridge. The NEL station was completed on 20 June 2003. In March 2007, it was announced that the NEL will interchange with the DTL at this station. The DTL platforms of the station opened on 22 December 2013 as part of Stage 1 of the line.

Each of the six entrances has glass structures, with the Pagoda Street entrance having a pavilion-style transparent roof structure and the DTL entrance having an elliptical shape. The station features two artworks as part of the MRT network's Art-in-Transit programme. The NEL concourse and platforms feature calligraphy as part of The Phoenix's-Eye Domain by Tan Swie Hian, while the DTL concourse walls feature artworks of clothes lines as part of Flying Colours by Cheo Chai Hiang.

== History ==
=== North East Line station (1996–2003) ===
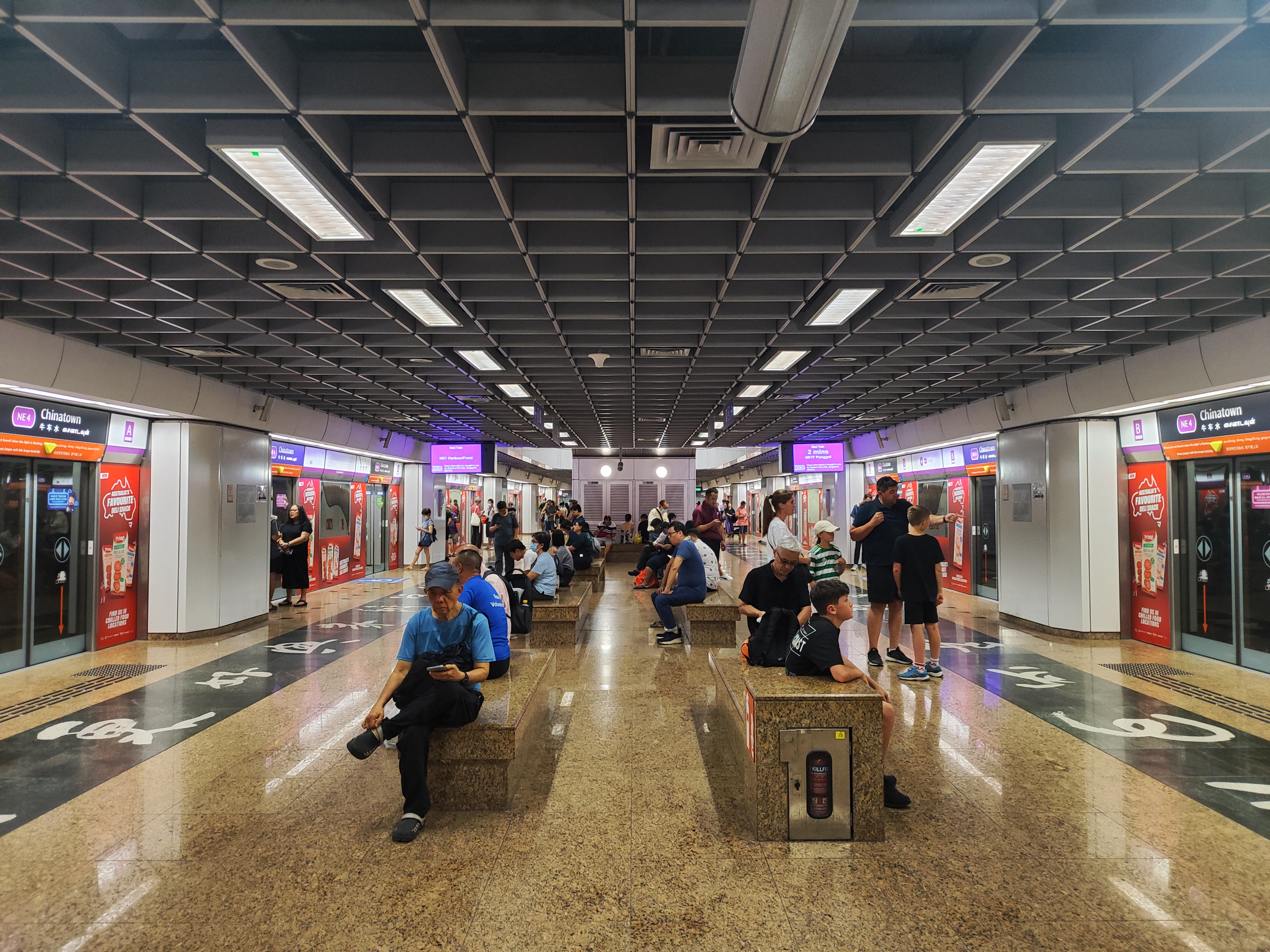
NEL platform level

Chinatown station was first announced as People's Park station, along with the 15 other North East Line (NEL) stations, by Communications Minister Mah Bow Tan on 4 March 1996. The contract for the design and construction of the station – Contract 709 – was awarded to a joint venture between Gammon Construction and Econ Piling in June 1997 at S$141.5 million (US$152 million in 2022).

The construction of the NEL station was one of the most challenging projects on the line. Arterial roads like New Bridge Road and Eu Tong Sen Street, as well as the connecting streets, had to be rerouted, closed and reinstated several times. These closures took place through seven major phases and numerous sub-stages from December 1997 to March 2002. The bus stops had to be shifted accordingly. As a result of the rerouted roads and the construction barriers, pedestrians had to take longer routes around the construction site to their desired destinations. In addition, businesses in the area were affected by the noise and construction dust, leading to tarnished goods and a decrease in patronage. The contractors made efforts to minimise these effects, such as using quieter machinery and cleaning the vehicles exiting the worksite. During the Lunar New Year in 2001, a temporary bridge was constructed to connect the two sides of Pagoda Street so pedestrians could walk over the entrance work site.

Following engagements with the local community, the Land Transport Authority (LTA) implemented measures such as shifting worksite hoarding aside to maximise walking space, working with artists to paint the worksite panels, minimising the worksite space at Pagoda Street and renovating the Garden Bridge (Note: A bridge built in 1995 that connects New Bridge Road to Eu Tong Sen Street.) to allow its integration with the station. A temporary taxi stand was installed at Upper Cross Street to serve the retail development of Chinatown Point. The LTA also built a temporary pedestrian staircase from the shops along New Bridge Road to the Garden Bridge.

Prior to the construction, the utilities found in the site had to be diverted at a cost of S$7 million (US$7 million in 2022) to prevent them from being damaged during the station's construction. The utilities had to be protected or substituted during the manoeuvre, and took some time due to the poor documentation of the location of the old pipes and cables. The Eu Tong Sen Canal running through the station site had to be dismantled and diverted into four 300 m (980 ft) steel pipes to connect the unaffected parts of the canal. It was planned to use steel beams to support the canal during ground excavation and the station's construction, but this would risk damaging the canal, causing the site to flood. The more time-consuming and expensive alternative to divert the canal into the 2.1 m (6.9 ft) diameter pipes would minimise such risks and allow sufficient space for the construction machinery. The LTA engineers decided to implement this alternative, which became one of the largest drainage diversion projects in Singapore. The pipes were suspended below the temporary road decking. After the station's construction, the canal, now wider and deeper, was rebuilt above the station.

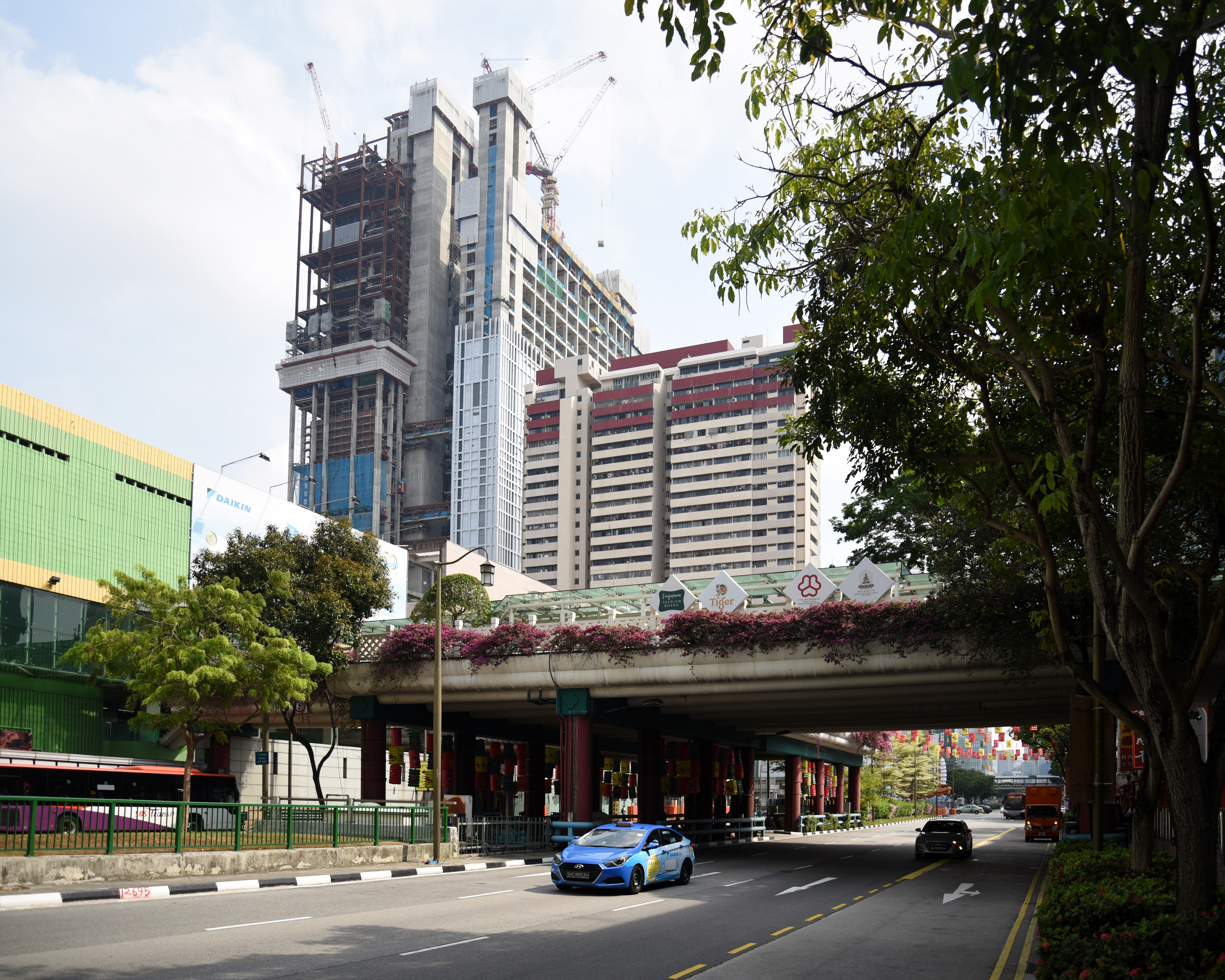
The Garden Bridge (pictured in 2018) was underpinned during the construction.

The construction also involved the preservation of Garden Bridge as it is a social and cultural landmark in Chinatown. Initially, there were plans to dismantle the bridge due to the columns and foundations being in the way of MRT works, but the LTA reversed its decision and decided to underpin the bridge using massive steel trusses. Certain sections of the bridge's central support were cut away to allow more space for efficient excavation and construction. The support columns were rebuilt after the station's completion.

Due to the soft marine clay above the stable sedimentary soil, there were a few cave-ins at the site during construction. On 3 July 1999, an unused section of the old canal caved in, forming a hole three metres (9.8 ft) deep. Several I-beams, a compressor and a small machine, which fell into the hole, were retrieved using a crane. It was discovered that some soil had seeped through a gap in the perimeter wall of the station, resulting in the collapse of the structure. The gap was made to accommodate a sewer pipe. In the evening of 22 November, a section of Eu Tong Sen Street collapsed, and it was closed along with neighbouring streets. The collapse formed an eight-by-five-metre (26 by 16 ft) hole with a depth of up to one metre (3.3 ft). Nobody was injured and the surrounding buildings remained intact. On 2 December that year, a two-centimetre (0.79 in) depression, along with cracks, was discovered on the road 15 metres (49 ft) away from the cave-in site, resulting in another road closure. It was found during an inspection of soil movement above the tunnelling machine underneath the street. One of the lanes remained open for buses. The road was dug open to inspect the utility pipes, cables and the two steel pipes underneath the road. Cement was pumped into the ground to stabilise the soil before the road was reopened to traffic on 5 December.

By mid-2002, the major roads were reinstated with most of the construction work complete. In conjunction with the station's opening, the surrounding shopping complexes People's Park Complex and the OG Shopping Centre underwent renovations and redevelopment. The former Majestic theatre near the station had also been refurbished and converted into a retail mall. With the NEL commencing services on 20 June 2003, it was expected that the station would bring further development to the area with more investments and crowds.

=== Downtown Line station and further plans (2007–2013) ===
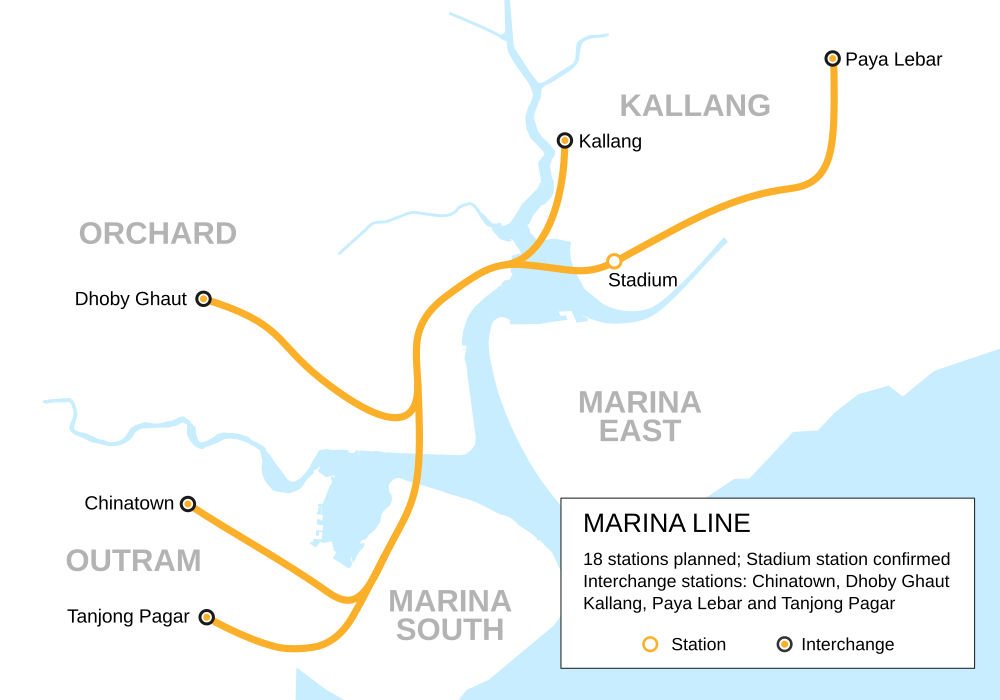
Map of the planned Marina Line

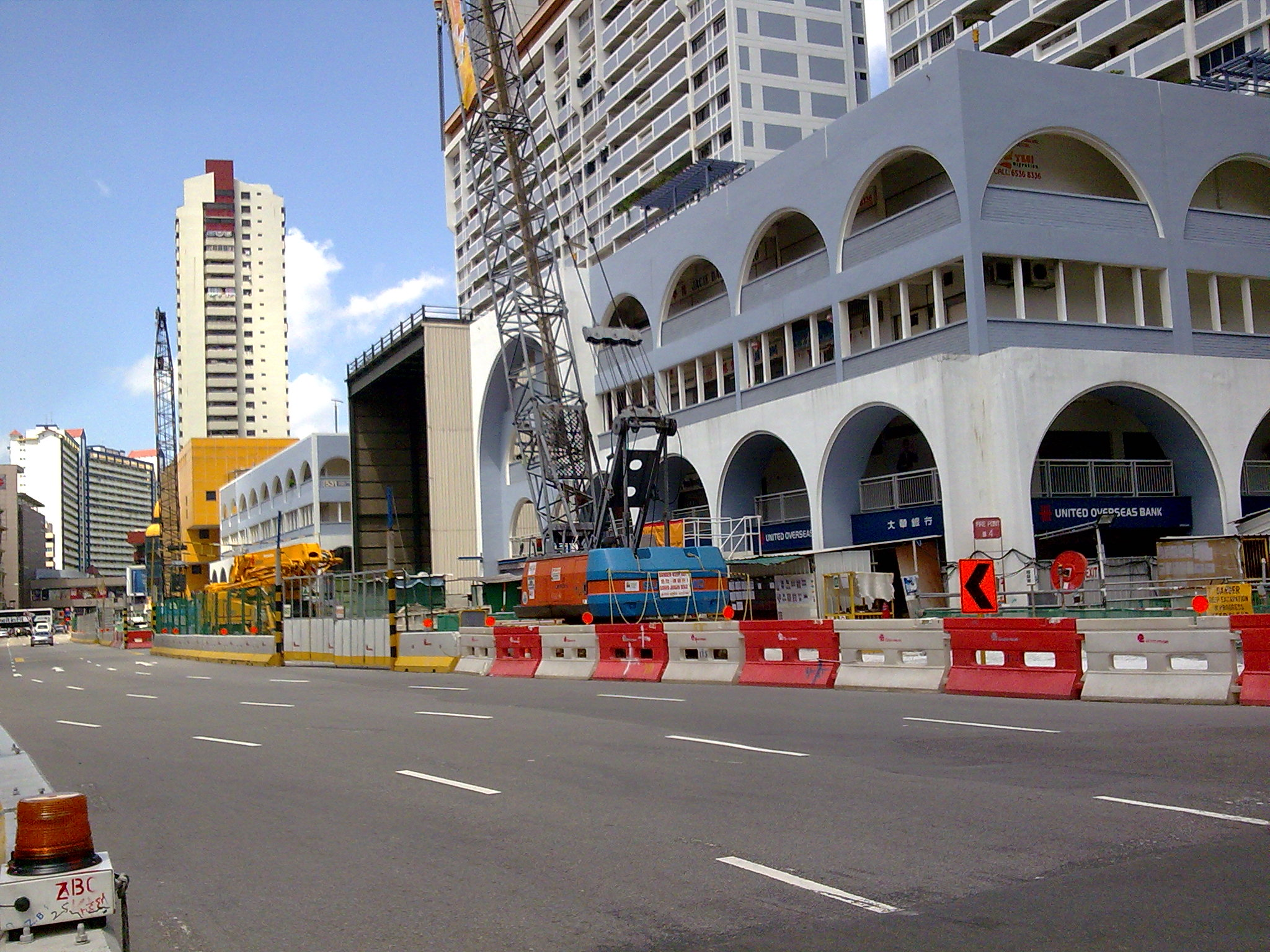
DTL construction site in December 2010

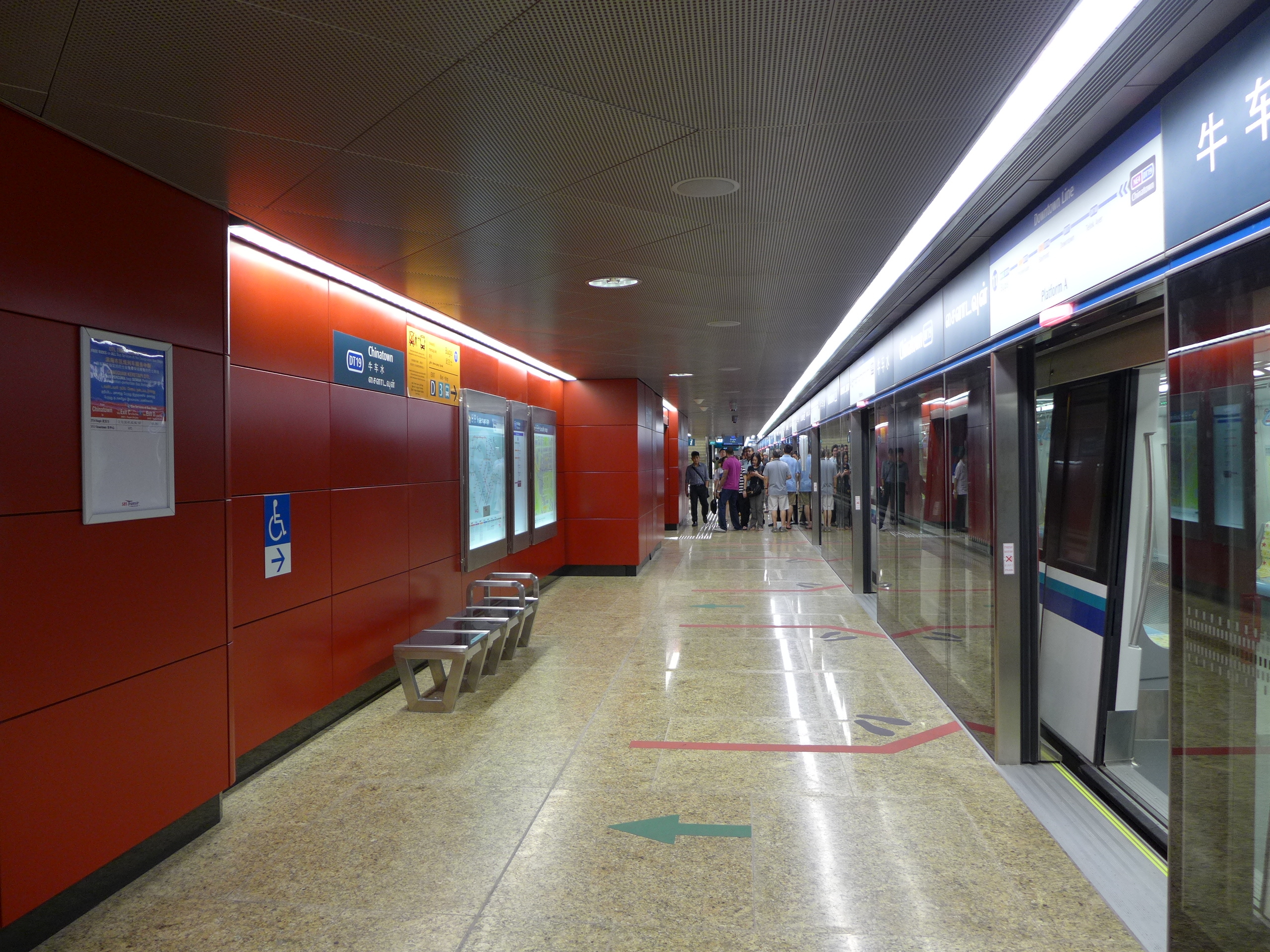
DTL Platform level

During the NEL station's construction, provisions were made for Chinatown station to link with a future MRT line. In October 1997, it was announced that the station would become the terminus of the proposed 12-kilometre (7.5-mile) Marina Line. In subsequent plans, however, the Chinatown branch was scrapped. The project was scaled down to six stations that would form the first stage of the Circle Line (CCL).

On 26 April 2005, Today reported that soil tests were being conducted around Chinatown station, raising speculations of a possible rail link between Chinatown and Marina Bay via a new developing downtown. However, the LTA expressed they had yet to decide whether to build such a line. On 14 June, the LTA announced that Chinatown station would be the terminus of the Downtown Extension (DTE) from Milennia station (now Promenade). The DTE, initially planned to be a branch of the CCL, was revised to be the first stage of the Downtown Line (DTL) in 2007.

In preparation for the DTL construction, the utilities underneath Cross Street and Upper Cross Street were diverted into a 500-metre (1,600 ft) long Common Utility Trench (CUT). The 7-metre (23 ft) wide and 3.5-metre (11 ft) deep CUT, located along Pickering Street and Church Street, was constructed using the cut and cover method. The contract for the CUT construction was awarded to Hwa Seng Builder Pte Ltd on 18 August 2006 for S$6.4 million (US$4 million). Contract 909 for the construction of the DTL station and associated tunnels was awarded to Gammon Construction at S$160.3 million (US$106.4 million) in August 2007. On 12 February 2008, the LTA held a ceremony at this station to mark the beginning of the DTL's construction.

During the construction, traffic was diverted to Cross Street and Upper Cross Street from March 2007 to the end of June 2008. The area in front of Hong Lim Complex and Chinatown Point had been closed off to build the support wall for the station and tunnels. Subsequently, a section of Upper Cross Street between Yue Hwa Building and Block 34 was realigned from 18 January 2010 until the station's completion in 2013. On 17 January 2013, transport minister Lui Tuck Yew visited the station, where he announced the 2013 Land Transport Master Plan. An open house was held on 7 December 2013, before the DTL station commenced operations on 22 December. The station was the terminus of the line until the opening of DTL Stage 3 to Expo station on 21 October 2017.

Extending the DTL tunnels from Chinatown to Fort Canning station was a challenge, due to the narrow space between two Housing and Development Board (HDB) blocks and the State Court along the route. In addition, the contractors had to divert the Singapore River for the tunnels’ construction. The DTL tunnels had to be stacked to overcome the space constraints. Before deciding on the route taken to cross the Singapore River, 20 other tunnel routes were considered by LTA engineers but were deemed too unsafe or too damaging to the environment or both. The diversion of the river was necessary as tunnelling underneath would risk sinking or flooding. The tunnel boring machine used could be obstructed by debris that remained stuck into the riverbed. There were considerations to dam the river but it would have disrupted businesses and tour boat operations along the river.

The river diversion, which started in 2012, involved removing components of the river embankment, constructing a series of dams, strengthening the soil and excavating a new 40-by-100-by-7-metre (131 by 328 by 23 ft) canal on the river's west bank. After the canal was built, part of the original river course was drained and filled with soil for the tunnels' construction. The debris along the tunnels’ routes were removed using piling rigs before tunnelling works commenced. To ensure the construction would not pollute the river (which is connected to the Marina Reservoir), the LTA had to maintain adequate hydraulic flows. After boring through the area, the river was realigned to its original course.

On 9 December 2022, as part of a joint emergency preparedness exercise by the LTA and train operator SBS Transit, security screenings were held at the station. Commuters entering the station were redirected to a set of fare gates near Exits A and G with Exit F closed. Such exercises were conducted to test established response protocols and maintain vigilance for quicker and more effective responses during emergencies and heightened security situations.

== Station details ==
=== Location ===
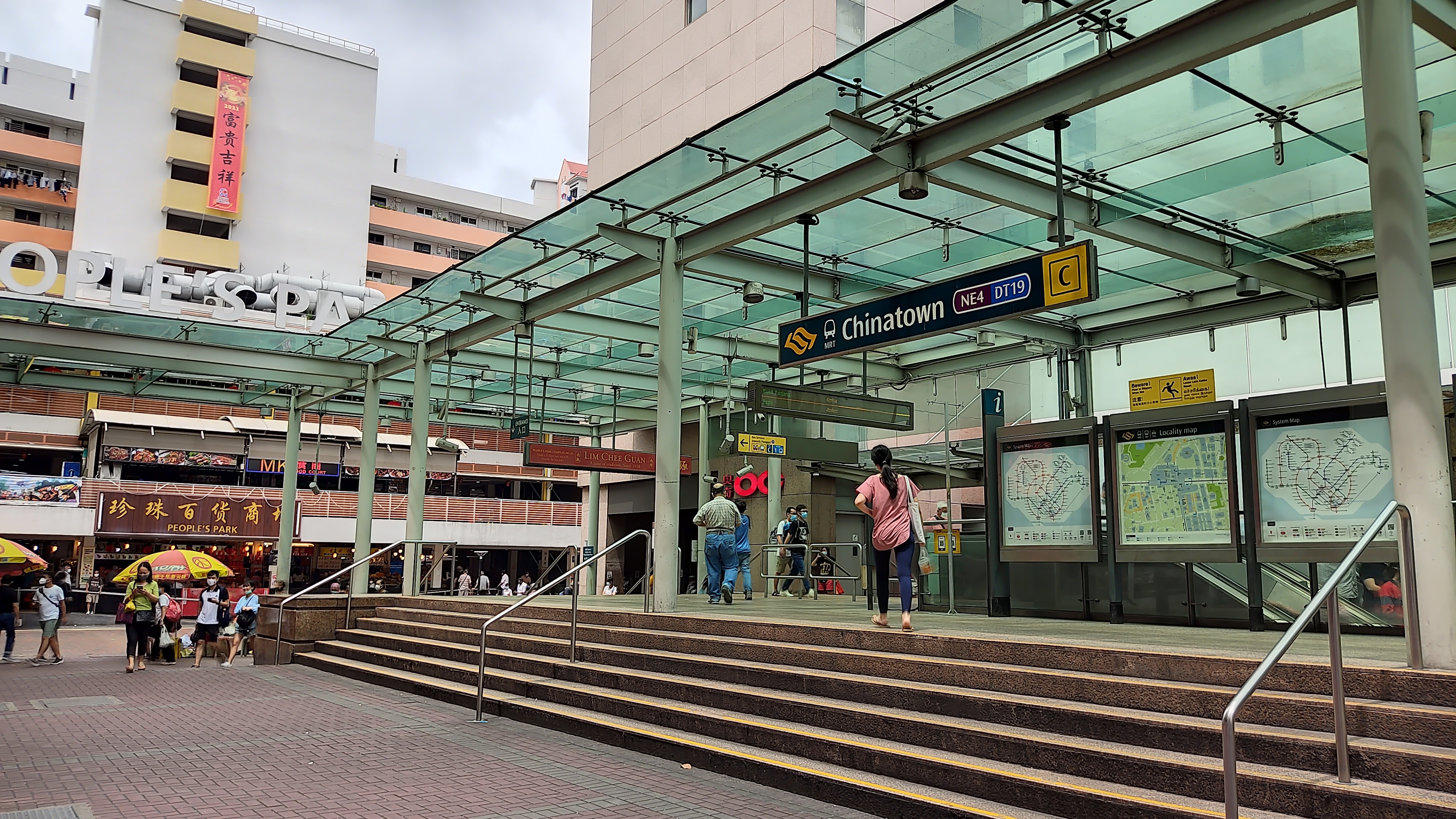
Exit C of the station

The station is located within the Singapore Chinese ethnic enclave of Chinatown. The NEL station is situated underground between Eu Tong Sen Street and New Bridge Road, while the DTL is underneath Cross Street. The NEL site was chosen to avoid having to demolish the historical shophouses and buildings in the area.

In addition, this station site is closely linked to shopping centres and busy pedestrian areas, such as Chinatown Point, Hong Lim Complex, People's Park Complex and The Majestic. Surrounding landmarks include the religious sites of Buddha Tooth Relic Temple, Masjid Jamae (Chulia), Fairfield Methodist Church, the Sri Mariamman Temple and the Sri Layan Sithi Vinayagar Temple. The station serves public amenities including the State Courts, Family Justice Courts, Chinatown Visitor Centre and the Kreta Ayer Community Centre.

=== Services ===
Chinatown station is served by the NEL and DTL; the official station code is NE4/DT19. On the NEL, the station is between the Outram Park and Clarke Quay stations, with trains running every 2.5 to 5 minutes. On the DTL, the station is between the Telok Ayer and Fort Canning stations, with trains on the line passing every 2.5 to 5 minutes.

=== Design ===
The station has two underground levels and six entrances. The NEL station has a length of 281 metres (922 ft) and a depth of 25 metres (82 ft). The station is unusually long, allowing connections to various surrounding places of interest. Alluding to the area's "rich oriental culture", the station is decorated with Chinese calligraphy on the floors of the station platforms and concourse as well as a mural on the wall across the concourse. The DTL station is 450 metres (1,480 ft) long, with plans to connect the station with the adjacent Telok Ayer station via an underground retail link. The link was completed in February 2026, between Chinatown DTL exit H and Telok Ayer exit E via ICON Link@Club Street.

The NEL station is designated as a Civil Defence (CD) shelter. It is designed to accommodate at least 7,500 people and withstand airstrikes and chemical attacks. Equipment essential for the operations in the CD shelter is mounted on shock absorbers to prevent damage during a bombing. When electrical supply to the shelter is disrupted, there are backup generators to keep operations going. The shelter has dedicated built-in decontamination chambers and dry toilets with collection bins that will send human waste out of the shelter.

The NEL and DTL platforms are wheelchair-accessible. A tactile system, consisting of tiles with rounded or elongated raised studs, guides visually impaired commuters through the station, with dedicated routes that connect the station entrances to the platforms or between the lines. There are wider fare gates that allow easier access for wheelchair users into the station.

Exit A to Pagoda Street features a pavilion-style transparent roof-structure which provides an unobstructed view of the shophouses and allows natural light into the station. As Pagoda Street is in a low-lying area vulnerable to flooding, the entrance has a mechanical flood barrier, eliminating the need to elevate the entrance to a level that would obstruct the view of the street. During a flood, water would flow into a chamber underneath the barrier's floor, causing the barrier to rise against the overflow. The other station entrances employ glass structures that allow views of the surrounding developments and natural lighting. The new elliptical entrance serving the DTL station reflects the elliptical façade of the nearby Hong Lim Complex.

== Public artwork ==
The station displays two artworks as part of the MRT network's Art-in-Transit programme – a showcase of public artworks on the MRT network.

=== The Phoenix's-Eye Domain ===
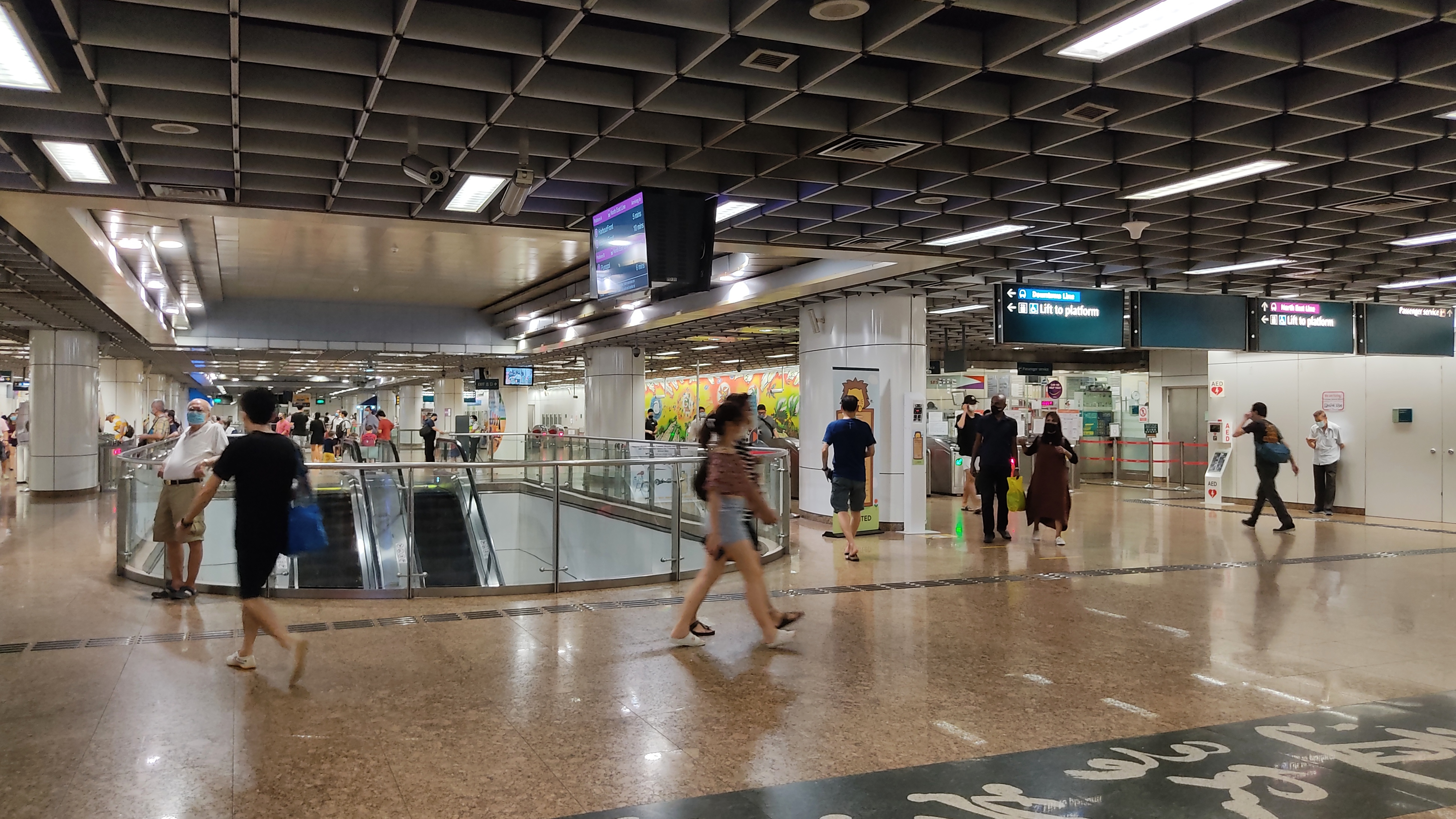
Chinese calligraphy on the concourse floor and the mural in the background

Tan Swie Hian's The Phoenix's-Eye Domain is a wall mural representing the journey of Singapore's Chinese immigrants, supplemented by a poem written in three sets of rhyming couplets. The colourful mural, depicting a soaring phoenix in various forms, is displayed at the NEL concourse level, while the poem is engraved on the floors of the station platforms and concourse. The artist intended for the poem to be a "footnote" to the mural, while the mural is supposed to be a visual realisation of the poem.

Taking inspiration from the description of the mythical phoenix in the Chinese classic text "Shan Hai Jing", the artist uses the phoenix as a symbol of perseverance and strength of the first Chinese settlers. Not intending to just use recognisable depictions of old Chinatown, Tan wished to capture the enduring and noble spirit of the ancestors, who are depicted in the artwork as helping build modern-day Singapore. In the mural, the phoenix flies over the waterfront of Singapore, which is by two kris-shaped rocks. These two rocks, which once existed at the waters' edge, were used as indicators by early Chinese navigators, who referred to Singapore as the "Dragon's Teeth Gate". Written on the phoenix's body are five characters, each with different meanings: Virtue, Righteousness, Civility, Benevolence and Credibility, regarded to be the five core values of man.

In another section of the artwork, the phoenix is shown in its full glory, being surrounded by a myriad of birds. This was intended to be an auspicious sign of Singapore's prosperity. In the last segment of the mural, the birds and phoenix combine into one, symbolising the "universal energy" of the cycle of life. The coolies on the mural are depicted as victorious strong men in classical Greek style rather than defeated labourers, as the artist felt the labourers were already well-built. Before the artwork was reproduced in the United Kingdom, Tan first drew out the work by hand. Instead of watering them down via a painting medium, Tan applied oil and acrylic paints directly onto the canvas. This was done to accomplish vibrant colour transitions for the work. However, it was difficult to reproduce this colour treatment when the mural was being produced in the United Kingdom. Through experimentation, the specialist company in Birmingham adopted a seven-colour process to closely match the original's colours on the final artwork in vitreous enamel.

The poetry, composed in a semi-cursive calligraphic script, employs the couplet – a pair of complementary verses set side by side. The calligraphy was first written in ink on rice paper before being scanned onto a computer and reproduced on the 1.2 m^{2} (13 sq ft) granite tiles. Each of the Chinese characters was cut out from grey slabs and inlaid into slabs of a darker tone, hollowed out for the characters. Placing the work on the floor, however, was considered unusual, as calligraphic works were usually placed on walls in auspicious positions. Tan explained that since life comes from earth, the earth is as auspicious as the sky. The artist intended to lay the characters on the same earth the first settlers had set foot on.

=== Flying Colours ===
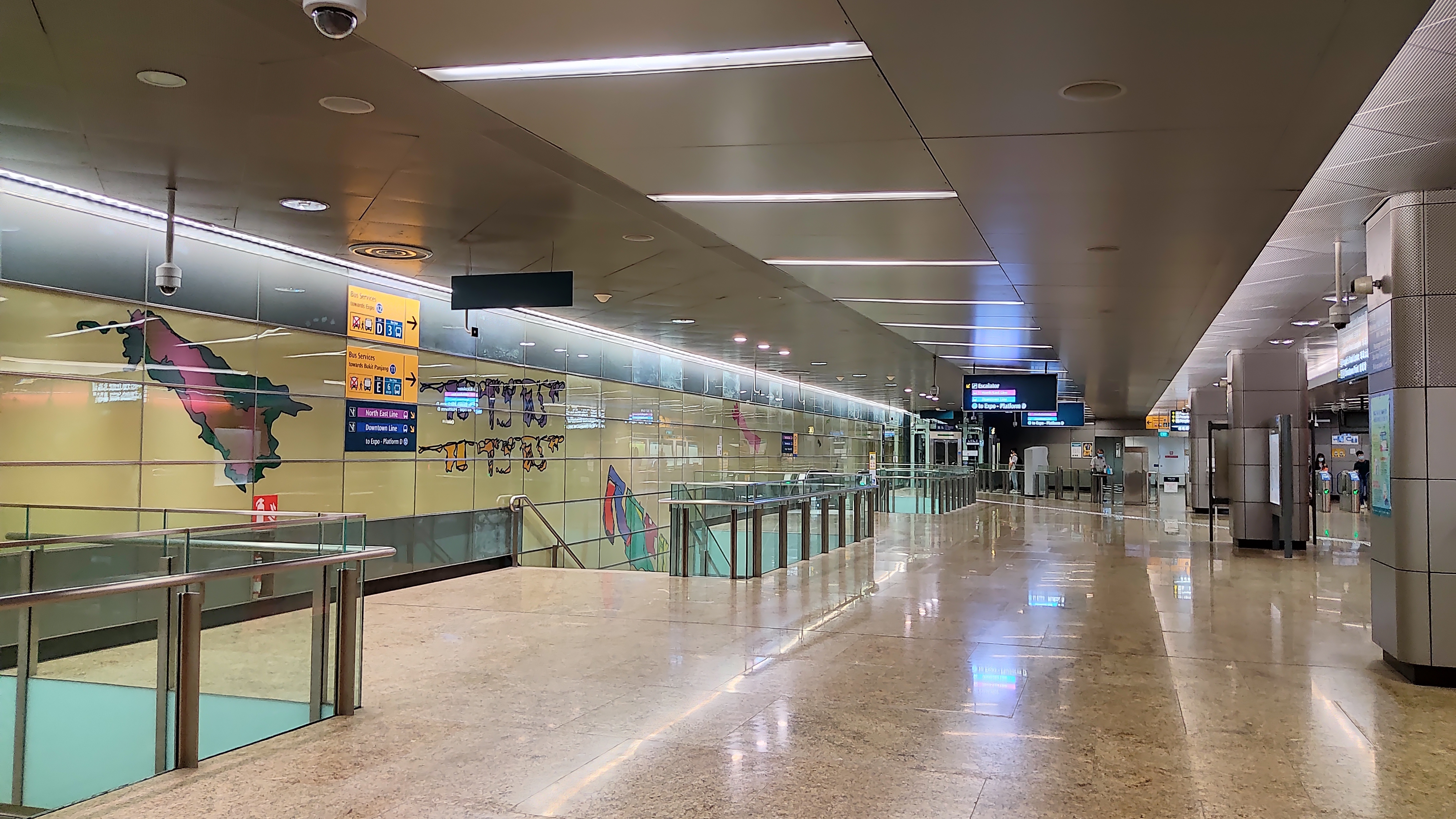
Flying Colours by Cheo Chai Hiang displayed across the DTL concourse level

The DTL concourse level features Flying Colours by Cheo Chai Hiang. The artwork depicts several clothes lines, a scene representing Singapore's high-rise HDB flats. The clothes lines changes slightly when viewed from different angles (i.e. a lenticular print). The artist sought to transform the "mundane" aspect of the scenery into something "festive and celebratory", while creating an illusion of clothes "flying in the wind". The angle of the clothes lines directs commuters to the platforms.

The DTL artwork has drawn mixed reactions from other artists. Jeremy Sharma, the artist of Holland Beat at Holland Village station, regarded the work as "original and attractive with a lot of playful humour". On the other hand, Yek Wong, the artist who created the artwork at one-north station, felt that the work did not quite deliver the concept and suggested it could be more "visually engaging".

== Notes and references ==
=== Bibliography ===
- Feng, Zengkun (2017). Downtown Line: Soaring to new heights (PDF). Singapore: Straits Times Press Pte Ltd. ISBN 978-981-4747-66-0. OCLC 1003852882.
- Leong, Chan Teik (2003). Getting there : The story of the North East Line. Singapore: Land Transport Authority. ISBN 981-04-5886-X. OCLC 53383062.
- Tan, Su Yen (2003). Art in transit : North East Line MRT. Singapore: Land Transport Authority. ISBN 981-04-7384-2. OCLC 52771106.
