= Yu Hua (disambiguation) =

Yu Hua is a Chinese author born in 1960.

Yu Hua may also refer to:

- Yu Hua (rower) (born 1981), Chinese female rower

== See also ==
- Yuhua
