= Yuhua =

Yuhua may refer to:

== Geography ==
- Yuhua, Changsha (雨花区), Hunan, China
- Yuhua, Shijiazhuang (裕华区), Hebei, China
- Yuhua, Singapore, a subzone region located in the town of Jurong East, Singapore
  - Yuhua Single Member Constituency, the former constituency that governed the subzone region

== People ==
- Yuhua Hamasaki, Chinese-American drag queen

== Other ==
- Yuhua Stone (雨花石), a type of stone from Nanjing, China

== See also ==
- Yu Hua (disambiguation)
- 裕華 (disambiguation)
