= Yue Hwa Chinese Products Emporium =

- Native name: 裕華國產百貨有限公司
- Industry: Retail
- Founded: June 1959; 67 years ago
- Founder: Yu Lianqing
- Headquarters: Champion Building, 301-309 Nathan Road, Jordan, Kowloon, Hong Kong; Yue Hwa Building, 70 Eu Tong Sen Street, 059805, Singapore
- Number of locations: 4 (Hong Kong); 3 (Singapore); (2025)
- Area served: Hong Kong; Singapore
- Website: Hong Kong website Singapore website
- Footnotes; Number of stores retrieved 2025

Yue Hwa Chinese Products Emporium
- Simplified Chinese: 裕华国货
- Traditional Chinese: 裕華國貨
Transcriptions
Standard Mandarin
- Hanyu Pinyin: Yùhuá Guóhuò

Yue Hwa Chinese Products Emporium Limited (Chinese: 裕華國產百貨有限公司), often abbreviated as Yue Hwa Chinese Products (裕華國貨), is a retail company in Hong Kong that specializes in Chinese products, with department stores in Hong Kong and Singapore. In addition, the Yue Hwa Chinese Products Group also fully owns Chung Hwa Medicine Company Limited, which manages over a dozen specialized Chinese proprietary medicine and health product stores in Hong Kong, as well as multiple properties in Hong Kong and overseas.

== History ==
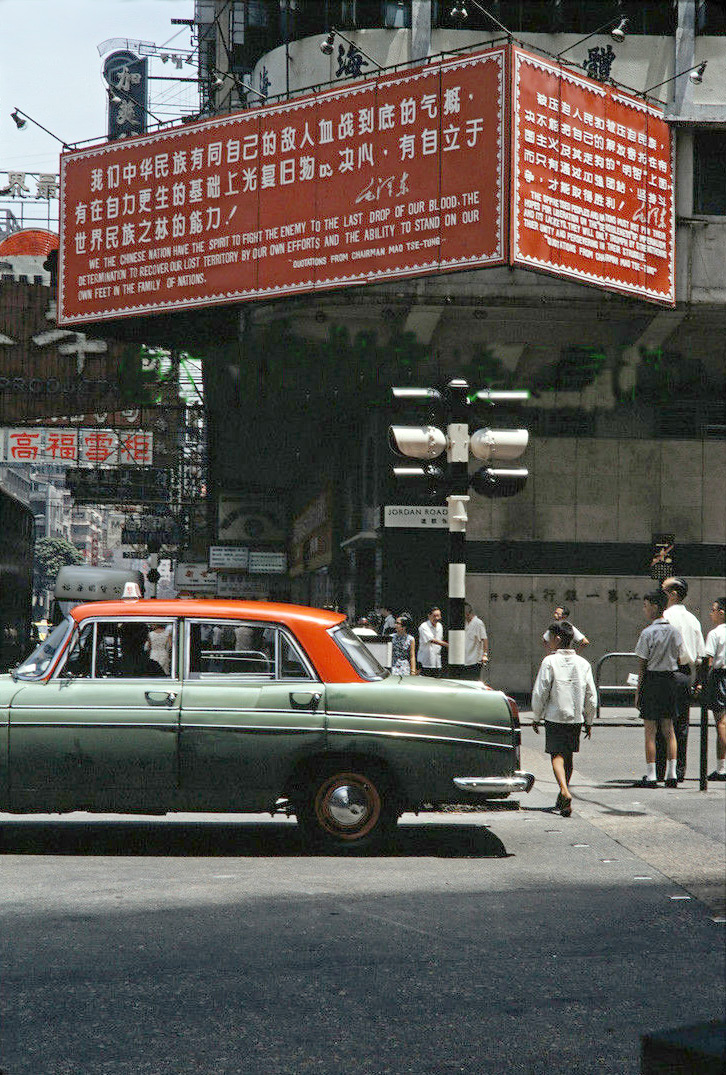
Former store location at New Lucky House in the 1960s

Yue Hwa Chinese Products Emporium was established in June 1959 as Yue Hwa Department Store (traditional Chinese: 裕華百貨; simplified Chinese: 裕华百货; pinyin: YùHuá Bǎihuò) by Yu Lianqing, a Hakka businessman who returned from Indonesia, a 500 square feet small-sized department store with a hundred odd goods. The name "Yue Hwa" (traditional Chinese: 裕華; simplified Chinese: 裕华; pinyin: yù huá), literally transcribing as "Fuyu Chunghwa" (traditional Chinese: 富裕中華; simplified Chinese: 富裕中华; pinyin: FùYù ZhōngHuá) signified the hope for a prosperous Chinese civilisation. The goods selection was expanded into thousands by the following year.

The flagship department store in Hong Kong, which was located at the junction of Nathan Road and Jordan Road, was opened in 1976. The Jordan flagship stall when opened, was the first in Hong Kong to utilise computerized payment system and escalators at every level of the building. The store, along with its neon signage, was widely recognised as a city icon of Hong Kong in the 1970s and 1980s.

=== Expansion into Singapore ===
In 1993, Yue Hwa Chinese Products Emporium expanded its department store business into Singapore with the takeover of Nam Tin Building, a six-storey conserved building along Eu Tong Sen Street which formerly housed The Great Southern Hotel, at a cost of S$25 million. The hotel ceased operations in 1994, and Nam Tin Building was converted at a cost of S$25 million. The property was re-opened in 1996 as Yue Hwa Building, as the first Yue Hwa Chinese Products department store in Singapore.

== Business ==
Yue Hwa Chinese Products Emporium operates large department stores in both Hong Kong and Singapore. In addition to its department store business, it also runs a chain of Chinese proprietary medicine stores, with branches scattered across Hong Kong Island (now closed), Kowloon, and the New Territories.

Yue Hwa Chinese Products Emporium deals in a wide variety of goods, including food, Chinese herbs and proprietary medicines, men's and women's clothing, traditional Chinese attire (華服), handicrafts, jewelry, bedding, towels, socks, silk, underwear, leather shoes, travel essentials, electrical appliances, medical equipment, furniture, stationery, sports goods, and musical instruments.

Yue Hwa Chinese Products sells traditional Chinese brands and products such as Hero fountain pens and ink, Chung Hwa pencils, Da Di brand undershirts and school leather shoes, Changbai Mountain ginseng, Tibetan Cordyceps sinensis, and Kweichow Moutai liquor.

Yue Hwa Chinese Products Emporium frequently organizes various product and cultural exhibitions and promotional events. It constantly introduces and promotes distinguished, high-quality products from different regions of China and from foreign countries, thereby continuing to maintain the unique character of a "Chinese products store." Past cultural exhibitions and promotional events have included the Sichuan Festival, Yunnan Festival, Jiangxi Organic/Green Food Expo, Taiwan Food Festival, Indonesia Festival, Southeast Asian Food Festival, International Porcelain Painting Exhibition, Shiwan Ceramic Ancient Collection Exhibition, Elegant Furniture Exhibition, and many others.

The Yue Hwa Chinese Products Main Store also features a "Tea Art Hall" (茶藝廳) where customers can sample tea and experience traditional Chinese tea culture. Additionally, the main store houses a "Culture Corridor" (文化廊), which introduces various Chinese arts and promotes high-quality products and culture from different provinces and cities across China.

=== Hong Kong ===
The Main Store is located at the intersection of Nathan Road and Jordan Road in Jordan, Kowloon, situated directly above the MTR Jordan Station. The shopping center occupies a total of seven floors. In addition to the main store, Yue Hwa Chinese Products has also opened over a dozen specialized Chinese proprietary medicine stores and Yue Hwa Health Product Centers across Hong Kong Island, Kowloon, and the New Territories.

The branch on the Park Lane Shopper's Boulevard previously operated under a different model as the Yue Hwa Travel Essentials "TRAVEL ESSENTIALS" from 2010 to 2013.

Closed branches include those at 1 Kowloon Park Drive on Peking Road in Tsim Sha Tsui, Park Lane on Nathan Road, Mirador Mansion, Alliance Building in Central, New Trend Plaza in Fortress Hill, and Telford Plaza in Kowloon Bay.

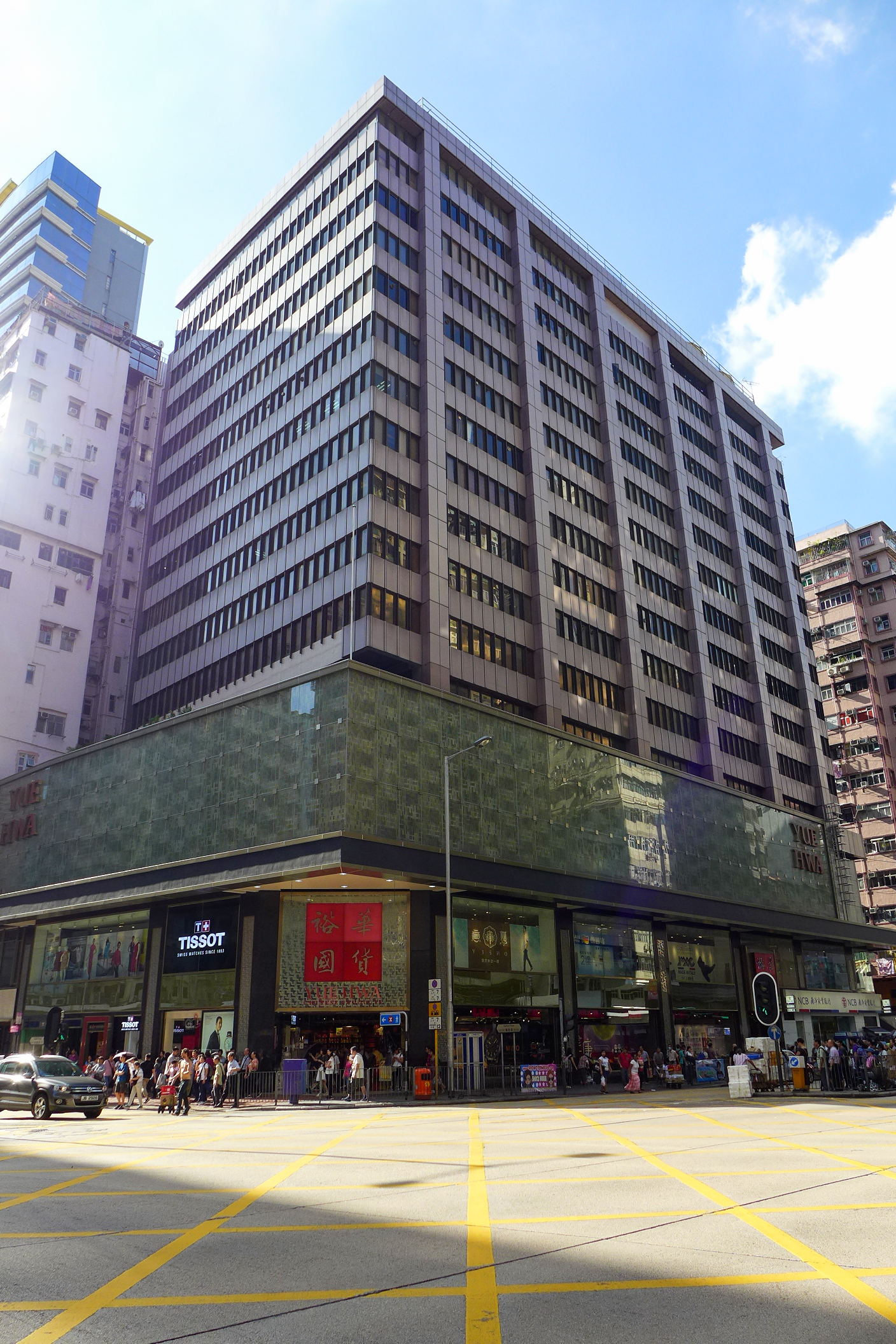
Flagship store at Jordan, Hong Kong, taken in September 2017.

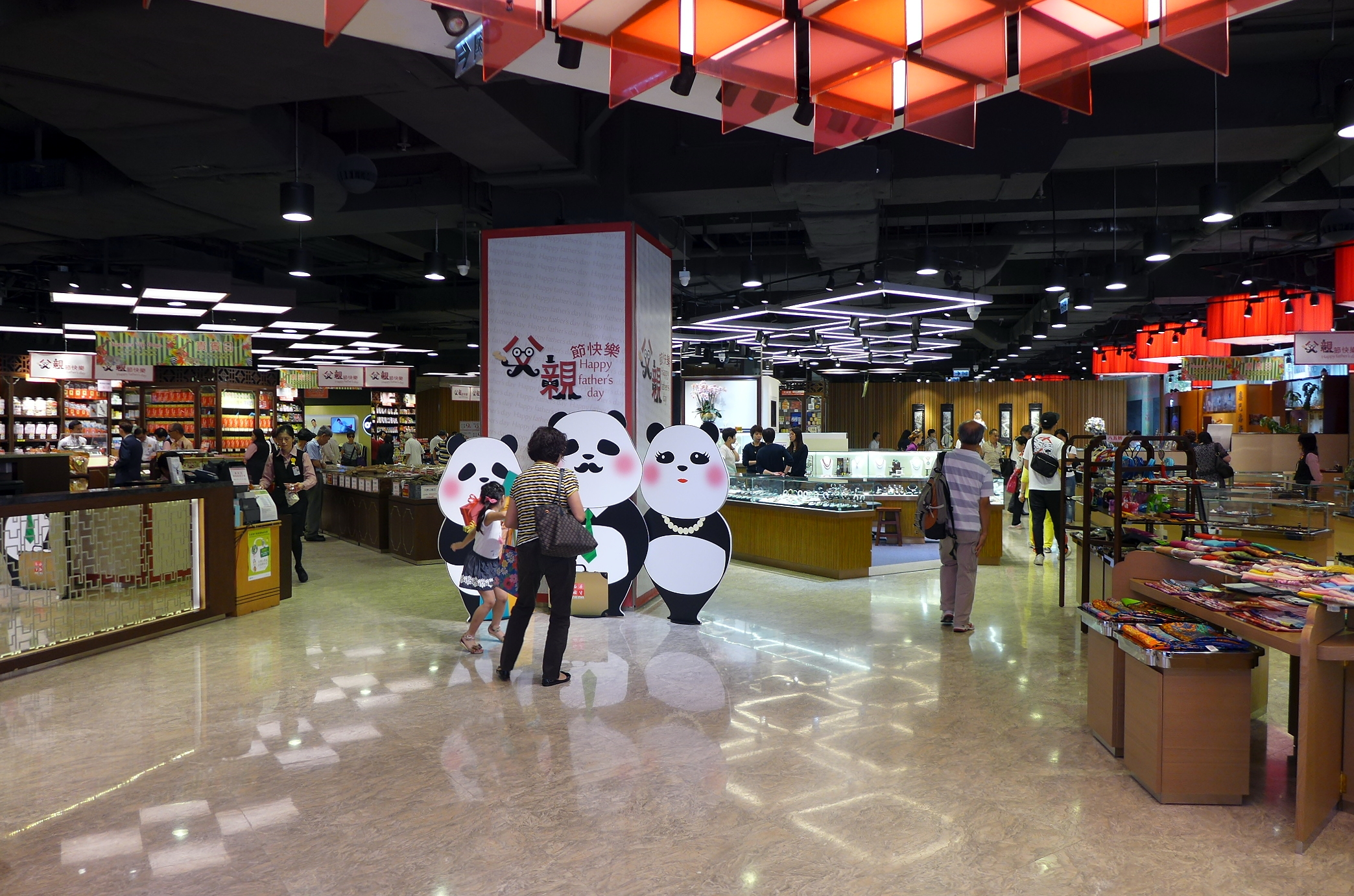
Interior of the flagship store at Jordan, taken in 2015

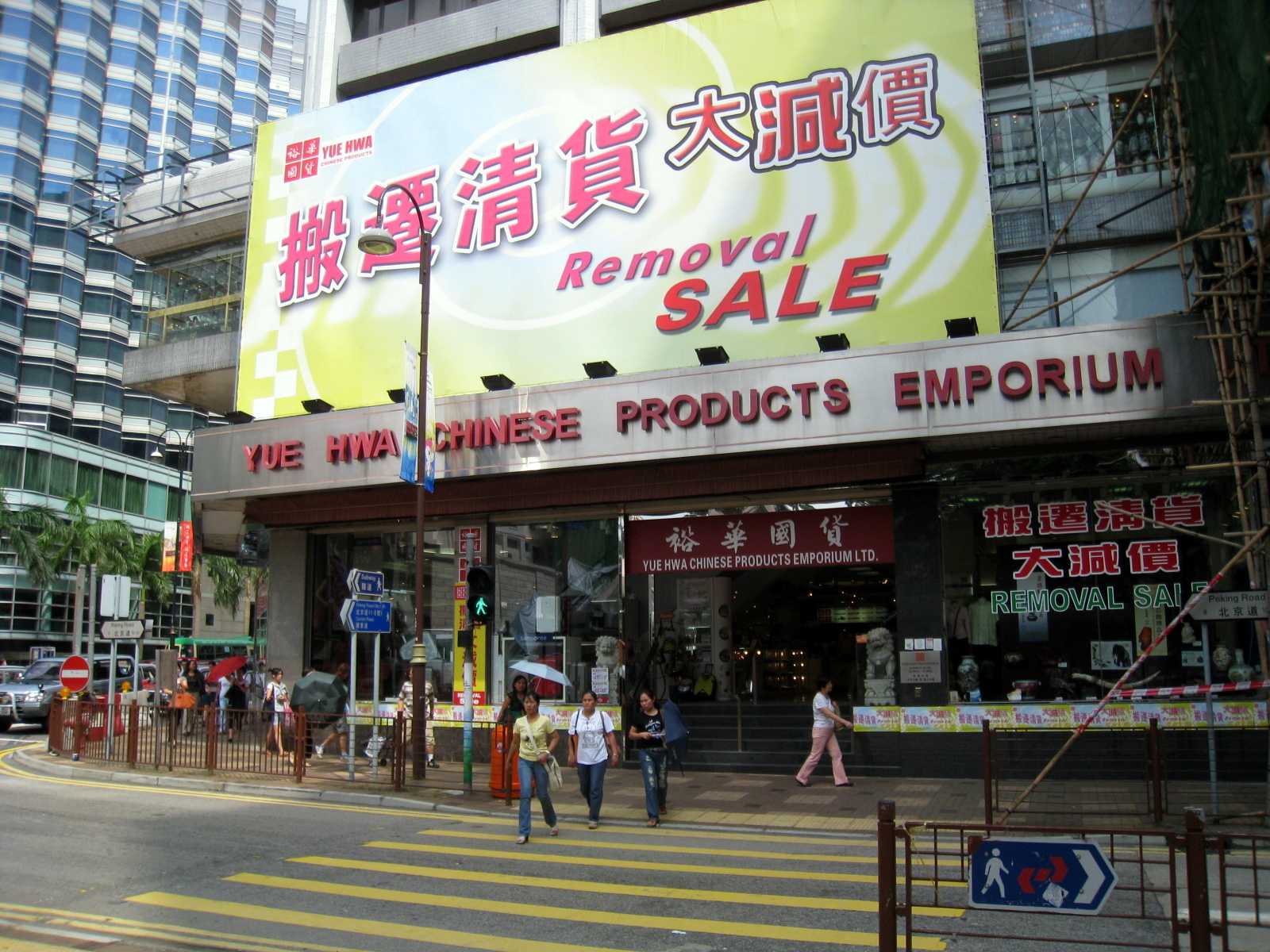
Former Tsim Sha Tsui Peking Road branch prior to its closure

=== Singapore ===
Yue Hwa Chinese Products operates three department stores in Singapore, with a flagship store located in Yue Hwa Building, in Chinatown. The other two stores are located in suburban malls - Jurong Point and Nex, where they sell mainly Chinese herbs, medicine and food products.

Yue Hwa Chinese Products has won a number of accolade over the last few years, namely,

- Learning Enterprise Alliance Award 2024 by the Centre of Workplace & Learning Innovation (SUSS)

- Department Store of the Year 2026 (Runner-Up) by Singapore Retailers Association (SRA) Retail Awards

- SRA Excellent Service (EXSA) Award 2026: Secured 2 awards, with team members winning Retail Impact Champion and the EXSA (Silver) Award.

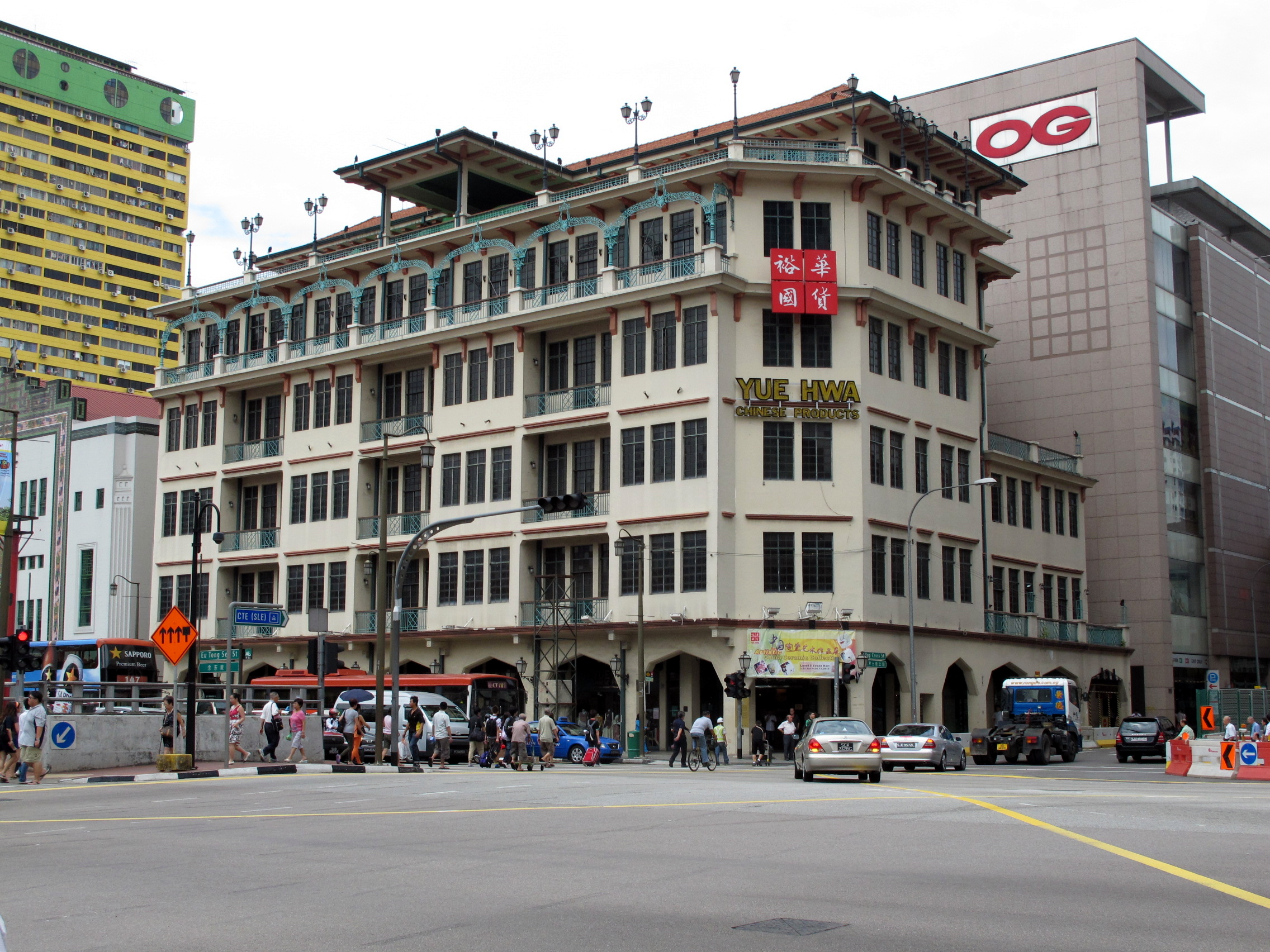
Yue Hwa Building, flagship store in Chinatown, Singapore.

=== Online store ===
In 2011, Yue Hwa Chinese Products Emporium started its online shopping service to provide a more convenient shopping experience for customers around the world.

Online shopping services was launched in Singapore in 2018.

== Yue Hwa's Song ==
In the 1980s, Yue Hwa Chinese Products Emporium commissioned the famous composer Joseph Koo to write the music, and the celebrated lyricist James Wong Jim to compose the lyrics based on the company's motto, "Yue Hwa Chinese Products, Serving Everyone" (裕華國貨，服務大家). The resulting piece became "Yue Hwa's Song" (《裕華之歌》).

== See also ==
- Scarlett Supermarket: Singaporean supermarket which specialize exclusively in Chinese products
