= Eu Tong Sen Street =

Road in central Singapore

Coordinates: 1°17′1.53″N 103°50′34.07″E

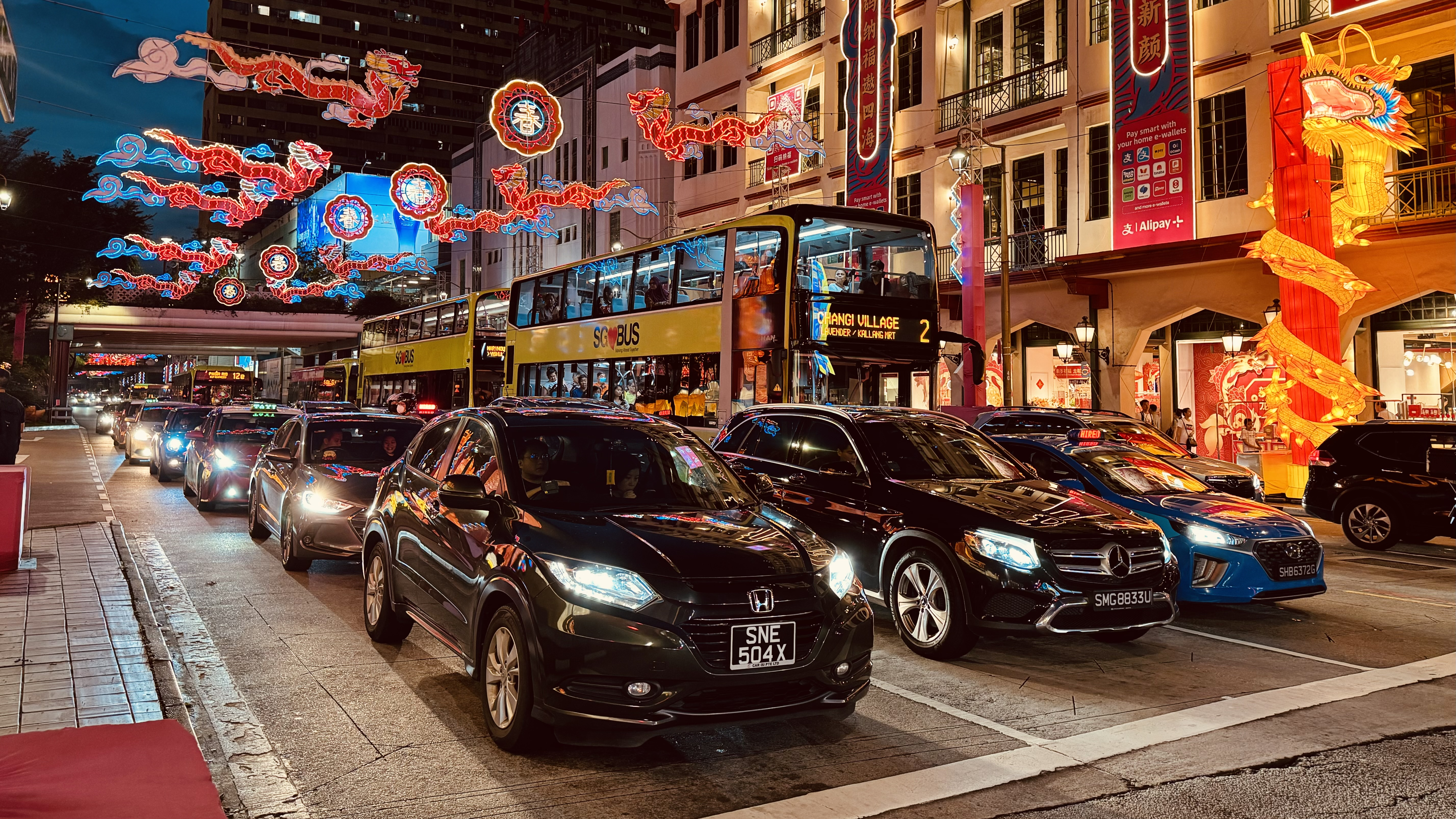
Vehicles on Eu Tong Sen Street, seen from the junction with Upper Cross Street

Eu Tong Sen Street (IPA: /ˌjuː ˌtɒŋ ˈsən/; Chinese: 余東旋街; pinyin: Yú dōng xuán jiē; Jyutping: Jyu4 Dung1 Syun4 Gaai1; Pe̍h-ōe-jī: Û-tong-suân-koe) is a major one-way road located in the central part of Singapore in the planning areas of Outram, Singapore River and Bukit Merah. The road starts at the junction of Hospital Drive, Kampong Bahru Road and New Bridge Road, and ends at the junction of Hill Street, North Boat Quay and New Bridge Road after crossing the Coleman Bridge. The road runs parallel to New Bridge Road throughout its entire length, but in the opposite direction. The road is served by many bus stops and Clarke Quay, Chinatown, and Outram Park MRT stations.

It is named after the Chinese tycoon Eu Tong Sen. It starts at the junction of Neil Road and Jalan Bukit Merah and is one of the major roads in Chinatown with a number of modern Chinatown landmarks such as the Eu Tong Sen Street Police Station, People's Park Complex, The Majestic, The Central and Pearl's Centre located on this street. During Chinese New Year and Mid Autumn Festival, the street is the major area for the lightup and the Chinese New Year countdown party. Lighting up ceremonies for the festivals are always held on this road.

== Etymology and history ==
Eu Tong Sen Street was formerly part of the former Wayang Street. In 1919, the street was renamed after Eu Tong Sen after he rebuilt the street and acquired two Chinese opera theatres, Heng Seng Peng and Heng Wai Sun. The two theatres were formerly situated at the current site of People's Park Complex. Another opera theatre, Tian Yien Moi Toi, was built on this street by Eu. Tian Yie Moi Toi was later converted to a cinema named Queens' Theatre which was later renamed as Majestic Theatre. The cinema was then converted into a shopping mall, The Majestic in 2003.

== Layout and design ==
Eu Tong Sen Street is largely a 4-lane road, expanding to 5 or 6 lanes at large intersections. It carries a 60 kilometers per hour speed limit. 1 of the road's lanes serves as a peak hour bus lane between Hospital Drive and Outram Park MRT station, and as a full day bus lane between Outram Park MRT station and Hill Street.
