= People's Park Complex =

Mixed-use skyscraper in Singapore

- 珍珠坊
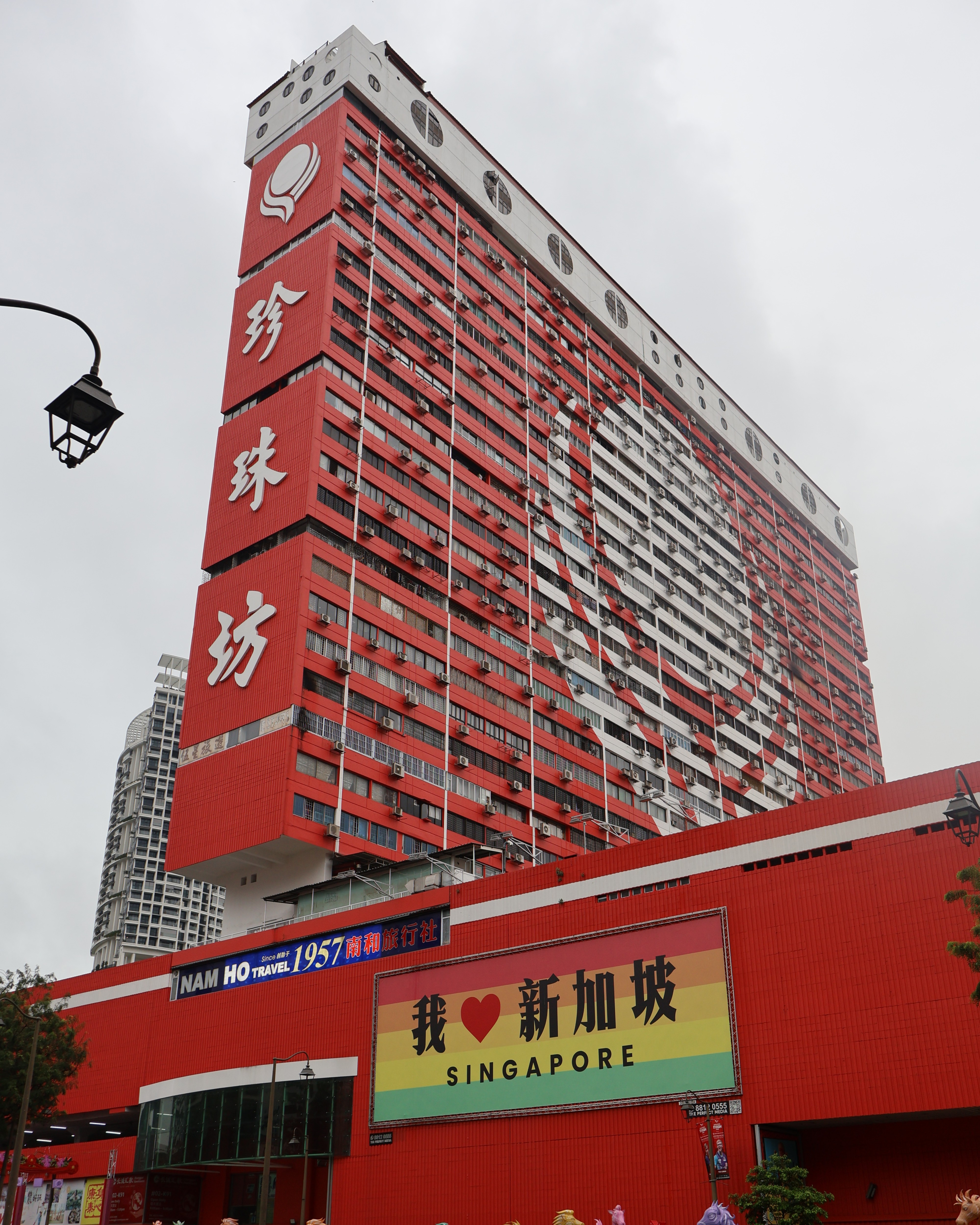
- Interactive map of the People's Park Complex area

General information
- Status: Opened
- Type: Commercial; Residential
- Architectural style: Brutalist architecture
- Location: 1 Park Road, Singapore 059108
- Coordinates: 1°17′02.6″N 103°50′31.8″E
- Opened: 1970; 56 years ago (shopping centre); 1973; 53 years ago (residential)
- Owner: People's Park Development

Technical details
- Floor count: 31
- Floor area: 845,000 square feet (78,500 m^{2})
- Lifts/elevators: 6 (3 resident, 2 passenger, 1 cargo)

Other information
- Public transit access: NE4 DT19 Chinatown

People's Park Complex (Chinese: 珍珠坊; pinyin: Zhēnzhū fāng) is a high-rise commercial and residential building in Singapore, situated in Park Road off Eu Tong Sen Street in Outram, within People's Park and next to Chinatown MRT station.

== History ==
The People's Park Complex was a commercial housing project undertaken by the newly formed Urban Renewal Department of the Housing and Development Board's Sale of Sites programme. The project was the subject of the programme's first sale in 1967.

Located at the foot of Pearl's Hill, the site where the People's Park Complex currently stands was an open public park. It later became the People's Market or Pearl's Market with outdoor stalls which was destroyed by a fire in 1966.

With a height of 103 metres (338 feet), the 31-storey People's Park Complex building was the first shopping centre of its kind in Southeast Asia and set the pattern for later retail developments in Singapore. The shopping centre was completed in October 1970, while the residential block was completed in 1973. Occupying 1 hectare in the heart of Chinatown, the People's Park Complex was the largest shopping complex in the shopping commercial belt along Eu Tong Sen Street and New Bridge Road.

=== 2010 fire ===
On 21 April 2010, a storeroom on the fifth floor caught fire, resulting in a huge blaze and triggering a massive evacuation. No-one was hurt in the incident, but substantial damage caused by soot and water leakage was reported by tenants. The Singapore Civil Defence Force (SCDF) subsequently found that the presence of such storerooms on that floor was not authorized, and was in breach of fire safety regulations.

=== Residential Lift Breakdowns ===
The three lifts in the residential block of People's Park Complex have been subject to media attention, due to their unreliability and frequent breakdowns. According to residents, the lifts "malfunction three to five times a month", thus forcing residents to take the stairs.

=== Renovation ===
People's Park Complex's food centre underwent repairs and redecoration work from 1 April 2023 to 30 June 2023. In 2025, the exterior of the building was repainted into a red and white paint scheme.

== Architecture ==
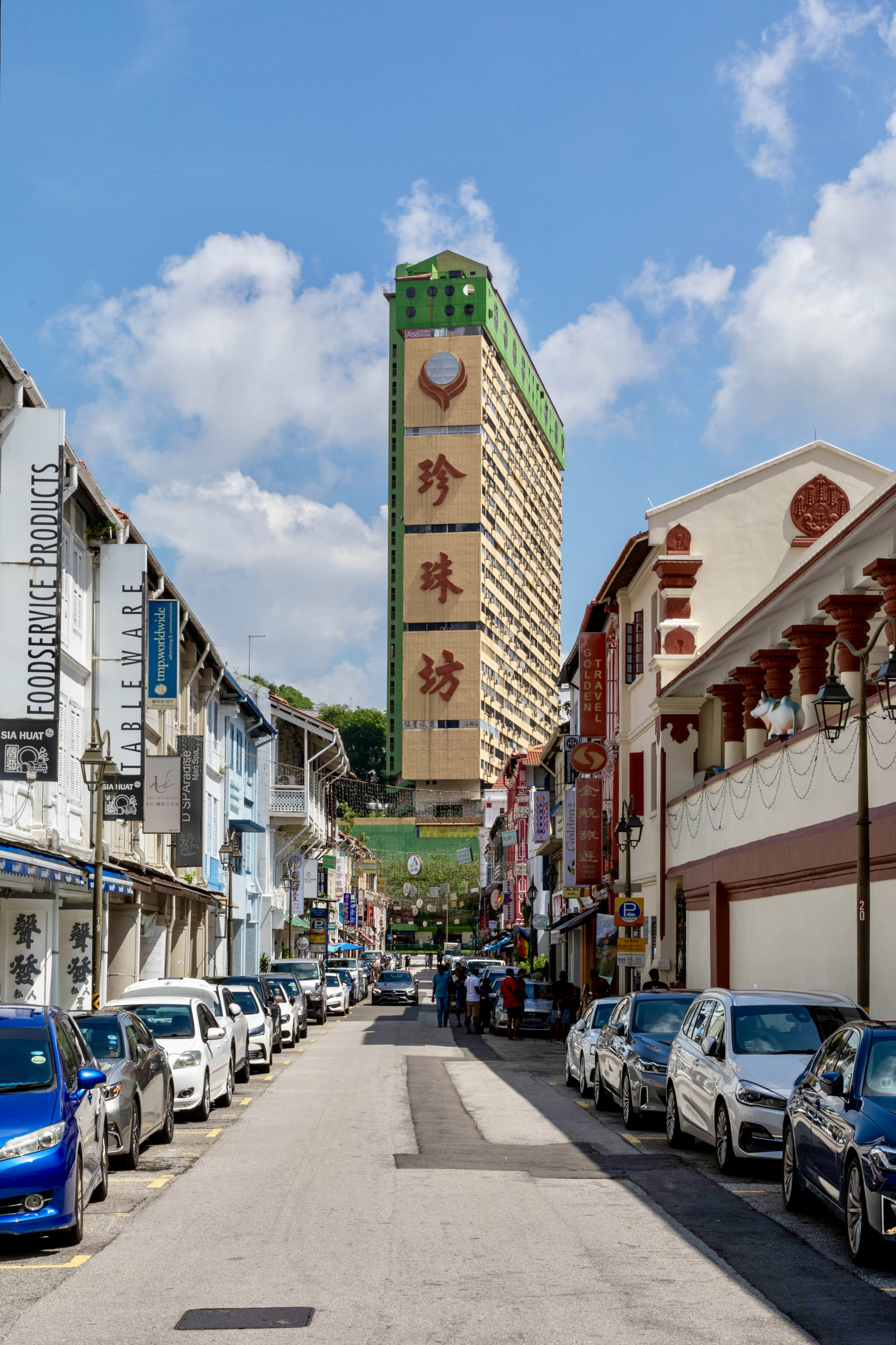
People's Park Complex from Temple Street.

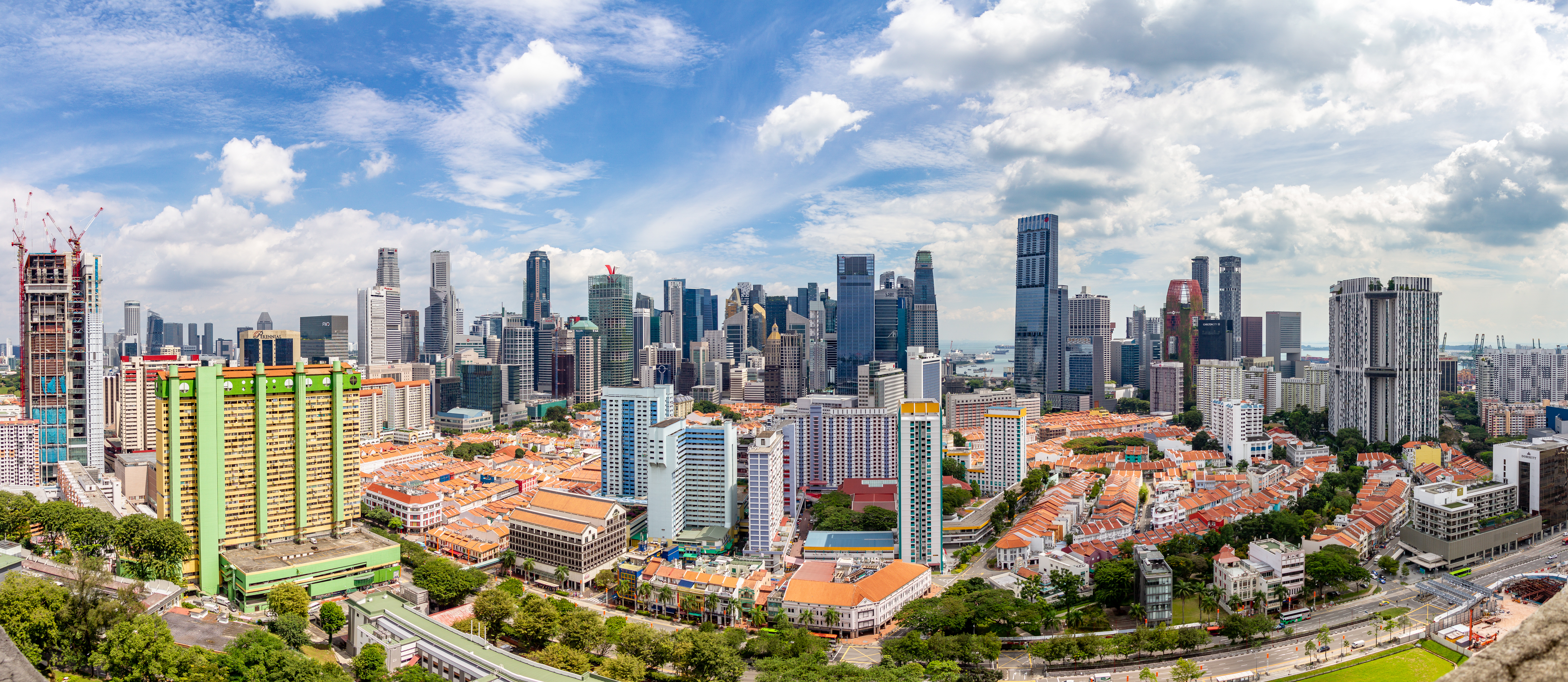
People's Park Complex at lower left corner with the surrounding cityscape.

In 1967, following the break-up of Malayan Architects Co-Partnership, William Lim set up Design Partnership (now known as DP Architects) with Tay Kheng Soon and Koh Seow Chuan. In its first year, the firm was successful with its architectural proposal for People's Park Complex.

The People's Park Complex is a large mixed-use development, consisting of offices and apartments above a podium of shopping space. The complex was envisioned as "a new nucleus within the whole fabric of the city core", and was designed to revitalise one of the most populated and traditional enclaves in post-independent Singapore. Being a "people's shopping centre", the complex is strategically located in one of the most populous areas in Singapore's central business district.

The architecture of the complex scored several firsts in Singapore. Its name as well as the block of flats was the closest to Le Corbusier's ideal of high-rise living, as expressed in his Marseille Unité d'Habitation, both in concept and in form.

The building's main tower accommodates a variety of apartment sizes, and access to them is independent of the shopping centre at the podium. Its 25 levels have been nicknamed "streets in the air", a development of the Corbusian ideal, and are intended to offer convenient spots for social interaction and intermingling. Design Partnership added verticals to the building's roof, enhancing the visual impact of the residential block. The roof-level common area contains shared amenities, like a crèche and open-air play space, built for communal use.

The shopping centre incorporates the first "city room" or atrium in Singapore, a concept that was pioneered by several Japanese architects under the Metabolist Movement in the 1960s. When Japanese architect Fumihiko Maki visited the site during construction, he exclaimed "But we theorised and you people are getting it built!". The shops in the shopping mall surround the large internal "city room", which consists of two multi-storey interlocking atriums, where a large number of "turn-over shops" and kiosks are located. The "city room" serves to retain the busy character of Chinatown.

The original exterior finish of the People's Park Complex was exposed raw concrete, in keeping with the Brutalist architectural style. This was also manifested in the design of the tower and podium, and the circular portholes topping off the residential building. Today, the building's façade has been painted over in shades of green and maroon.

== Activity ==
People's Park Complex also houses trades which are excluded from the main parts of Chinatown. The sidewalk located outside People's Park Complex is famous for the elderly cobblers who set up makeshift workspaces to repair shoes, a tradition present since the 1950s.

== See also ==
- List of shopping malls in Singapore
