= Esther Tay =

Singaporean fashion designer (born 1955)

- Born: 1955 (age 70–71); Pasir Panjang, Singapore
- Occupations: Fashion designer, dressmaker, entrepreneur
- Years active: 1973–present
- Known for: Pioneering Singaporean fashion designer; first Singaporean designer to have outfits sold in Japan
- Notable work: Esta brand; Estabelle Fashions
- Awards: Inducted into Singapore Women’s Hall of Fame (2023)

Esther Tay (born 1955) is a pioneering fashion designer and dressmaker in Singapore. She was the first Singaporean designer to have had outfits sold in Japan.

== Early life and education ==
Tay was born in Pasir Panjang, Singapore in 1955. She was the daughter of a paper merchant and the second of six children. When she was young, she was amazed by her mother's sewing. Although she wanted to study overseas and learn to drive, her conservative father believed that studying overseas and driving were not for women. However, she ended up spending the money her mother had given her to buy textbooks for driving lessons instead. She studied dressmaking at the now-defunct Baharuddin Vocational Institute as she did not do well enough in her studies to take the courses on graphic designing and advertising.

== Career ==
Tay began working at the Nutmeg Tree, a fabrics store in the Tanglin Shopping Centre, in 1973. She convinced the owner of the store to allow her to convert some of the fabrics into outfits to be sold. The outfits sold well and the store was converted into a boutique soon after. She established Estabelle Fashions in 1976. In 1984, she launched the Esta brand. Outfits of the brand were sold at Tangs, where she also had a concept corner. By the following year, her clothes were also sold in several other department stores in Singapore. In the 1980s, she was among the "Magnetic Seven", a group of pioneering fashion designers in Singapore who had their work exhibited abroad by the Trade Development Board, along with Tan Yoong, Bobby Chng, Thomas Wee, Celia Loe, Kelvin Choo and Peter Kor. She and Loe were the only women in the seven. During the first Society of Designing Arts show in 1985, she invented the sarong wrap skirt, which was later popularised by American fashion designer Donna Karan. She was selected as the designer of the month by The Straits Times for February 1986. In 1987, she was voted the best female Singaporean designer by The Straits Times. By 1990, she had designed uniforms for OCBC Bank, Citibank and the National University Hospital.

In 1991, Tay began selling collections to prominent Spanish department store chain El Corte Inglés. In 1992, she designed uniforms for the Port of Singapore Authority, as well as for the counter staff of the Public Utilities Board, the Inland Revenue Authority of Singapore and the Work Permit and Employment Department of the Ministry of Labour. In the same year, Japanese outlets of department store Takashimaya began selling her outfits. This made her the first Singaporean designer to have their outfits sold in Japan. She was also made the resident designer of the Bali Boutique, an in-house label, making her the first Singaporean to sit long-term on a Japanese design team. In May, she was awarded a gold medal by the Trade Leaders' Club of Spain for good finishing and international appeal, making her the first Singaporean to have been honoured by the club. By 1994, she had also designed uniforms for the Singapore Armed Forces, the Housing and Development Board and Singapore Post. Her collections had also been sold across the region, as well as in Guam, Tahiti, Bermuda and Australia by then. By 1995, she had established four boutiques in Singapore. Additionally, she had established 10 concept corners in Singapore and 15 more elsewhere in the region. Her outfits were manufactured in a factory in Bukit Merah that she owned.

During the 1997 Asian financial crisis, Tay closed down many of her boutiques. In 1998, she opened Esta — The Lifestyle Store, a home accessories shop. In 2001, she designed the Team Singapore formal attire for the Singapore National Olympic Council. Her last boutique, which was in the Scotts Shopping Centre, closed in 2003 along with Estabelle Fashions. She has since designed uniforms for several prominent Singaporean companies, including Singtel, NTUC Income and Singapore Airlines. She was approached by the National Olympic Council in 2015 to redesign and update the Team Singapore attire. The redesign was worn at the 2016 Summer Olympics opening ceremony and several other official sporting events. In 2019, she relaunched her fashion wear label Esther Tay. She initially planned to take part in fashion fairs, but the COVID-19 pandemic put a halt to her plans. In 2023, she was inducted into the Singapore Women's Hall of Fame.

== Personal life ==
Tay married Paul Chua, who served as the director of Estabelle Fashions. They have three daughters.
