= Celia Loe =

Celia Loe (born 1943) is a pioneering fashion designer in Singapore.

== Early life and education ==
Loe was born in Johor, Malaysia in 1943. She was the eldest of seven children. After her family moved to Singapore, she began attending Cedar Girls' Secondary School and learned to sew in her spare time. Loe left for London to study fashion design. Initially, she enrolled in a nursing school, which allowed her to earn a salary to support herself, as her parents could only afford to buy her a plane ticket to London. After she had saved up enough money, she successfully applied for a scholarship for a three-year diploma course in fashion design at Chiswick Polytechnic.

== Career ==
In 1971, a year after she had returned to Singapore, Loe established a boutique, First Stop, in the Tanglin Shopping Centre with $10,000 she had borrowed from her father-in-law. Following the success of her first boutique, she opened a second one in Plaza Singapura in 1974. In the same year, she began exporting to Saudi Arabia, Malaysia and Indonesia. Her third boutique was opened in Thomson Plaza in 1979, and her fourth was opened in The Centrepoint in 1983. Her fifth boutique was opened in Wisma Atria. In the 1980s, she was among the "Magnetic Seven", a group of pioneering fashion designers in Singapore who had their work exhibited abroad by the Trade Development Board, along with Tan Yoong, Bobby Chng, Thomas Wee, Esther Tay, Kelvin Choo and Peter Kor.

In 1989, Loe designed SilkAir's first cabin crew's uniform when regional airline started operations.

In 1990, she established a boutique in Kensington, London. In 1993, she established a second boutique in London on South Molton Street. By then, she had established six boutiques in Singapore, and had also established a factory in Shanghai. She began to establish boutiques in Malaysia in 1996. By the early 2000s, she had established over a dozen stores. She retired from the business in 2013.

In 2023, she was inducted into the Singapore Women's Hall of Fame.

== Personal life ==
Loe is married and has two children.
