= Thomas Wee =

Singaporean fashion designer

Thomas Wee (born 1949) is a Singaporean fashion designer. He was active in the 1980s and the 1990s. He returned to designing in 2008.

== Early life ==
Wee's mother was a seamstress from Shanghai. He made his first cheongsam when he was 14.

== Career ==
In the 1970s, Wee was employed at the boutique Flair as a designer. In 1978, he entered the Her World Young Designer’s Contest.

In 1983, he established his first high-end boutique, "Thomas Wee". He established "Mixables", the first career wear line for women by a Singaporean designer. In 1985, he was selected to represent Singapore in "The Best of Asian Designers", "The Best of the Best" and "The Premier Designer Show". By the late 1980s, he was considered to be one of the "Magnetic Seven", a group of pioneering fashion designers in Singapore, along with Tan Yoong, Bobby Chng, Celia Loe, Esther Tay, Kelvin Choo and Peter Kor.

From 1999 to 2010, he taught fashion at the Nanyang Academy of Fine Arts. In 2001, he established another boutique, "Thomas Wee Luxe", which he closed in 2003. In 2008, he launched a show at the Singapore Fashion Festival. In 2016, he established the boutique Maison Thomas Wee at the Mandarin Gallery.
