= MPPL =

MPPL may refer to:

- Multi Purpose Programming Language, an early name for PL/I
- Marine Parade Public Library, a public library in Marine Parade, Singapore
- Mount Prospect Public Library, a public library in Mount Prospect, Illinois
