= Tanjong Katong Primary School =

Tanjong Katong Primary School 丹绒加东小学 (Dānróng Jiādōng Xiǎoxué) Sekolah Rendah Tanjong Katong

Location
- 10 Seraya Road, Singapore 437259
- 1°18′19″N 103°54′2″E

Information
- Type: Government
- Motto: Nothing but the best
- Established: 2001
- Session: Single
- School code: 1773
- Principal: Cheak Seok Kuan
- Enrolment: 1,700 (in 2007)
- Colour: Green
- Website: www.tanjongkatongpri.moe.edu.sg

Tanjong Katong Primary School is a government primary school, located on Seraya Road in Tanjong Katong, under Marine Parade Planning Area in the East Region of Singapore.

== History ==
=== Establishment ===
Tanjong Katong Primary School was a primary school which began operations on 2 January 2001. It was formed with the amalgamation of three schools — Fowlie Primary School, Haig Boys' School and Mountbatten Primary School — under the Ministry of Education's (MOE) Programme for Rebuilding and IMproving Existing schools (PRIME). PRIME is a programme that was initiated by MOE in 1999 to upgrade and rebuild school buildings in Singapore, providing a physical environment conducive to learning. Schools with small enrolment and which are near another would be merged to optimise the use of resources. A new school building was built on Seraya Road for Tanjong Katong Primary School's merger in 2001.

The school was officially opened by then-Minister for Community Development Abdullah Tarmugi on 15 July 2004.

=== Foreign students ===
Tanjong Katong Primary School is a popular school with the expatriate community in Singapore. 40% of the school's enrolment are foreigners, with the school's 1,700 pupils coming from 39 countries in 2007. As a result, Tanjong Katong Primary School has the most diverse student population among all government-operated schools in Singapore. First Toa Payoh Secondary School comes in at second place with students from 19 countries.

When Tanjong Katong Primary School opened in January 2001, about 100 foreign children registered for places at the school. Today, the school is well-established, resulting in high local demand and limited places for foreign students. As a result of its diverse student population, the school has earned the reputation of being the "local international school" and a "mini United Nations". Many of these expatriates preferred to enrol their children into a local government school as school fees are less expensive than those at an international school.

While South Korean, Chinese and Indonesian pupils outnumber the rest, there are also children from more distant countries such as Yemen, Norway and Israel. The foreign children enrolled have had to adjust to the Singapore school system due to different language abilities. Teachers also faced different parental expectations: Foreign parents usually ask that their children be given a lighter workload while local parents ask for the opposite.

=== Primary One registration in 2007 ===
Due to the popularity of Tanjong Katong Primary School with expatriate parents, parents anxious to get their children into the school started queueing for Phase 3 of the Primary One registrations from 8 p.m. on 27 August 2007. This was despite the registration starting only in the morning of 30 August. Phase 3 registration is meant for foreigners who do not have Singapore permanent residency, though citizens and permanent residents who have yet to secure a place could also apply. Places are usually given out on a first come, first served basis.

When Phase 3 registrations started on 30 August, there were still 6,000 available places across all primary schools in Singapore. Principals had advised parents against homing in on certain schools since all schools provide quality education. In spite of this, camping tents were set up at Tanjong Katong Primary School, maids were asked to queue, and parents came prepared with packets of food and blankets. On 29 August, MOE had informed the parents that the school had only one place left, and that place would go to the first person in the queue as balloting would not be carried out unlike in the earlier phases. Despite this, four of the original 11 parents continued to remain in the queue.

In view of the school's popularity, parents, both locals and foreigners, have already signed up to do volunteer work so that they can enjoy priority in enrolling their children for the 2009 intake. MOE has assured that while parents may not obtain a place at the school of their choice, there are enough places in schools for all eligible Primary One children to receive a quality education.

== Highlights and achievements ==
- Tanjong Katong Primary School offers unusual co-curricular activities such as golf, cricket and bowling .
- The school is one of the schools under the Retired and Senior Volunteer Programme which is a charity under the auspices of Singapore's National Council of Social Service. RSVP champions volunteerism by senior citizens, who help to mentor latchkey children from the school.
- In 2001, 1,326 bottle caps were collected by the school to raise funds for the Society for the Physically Disabled. The school collected the most caps among the nine schools which took part in the charity drive. The metal from the caps were donated to the Prosthesis Foundation in Thailand to make artificial legs.
- In 2007, the school was awarded a Bronze for the National Arts Education Award by Singapore's National Arts Council.
- In 2008, The Tanjong Katong Primary Netball Team were champions in the East-Zone Netball Championship for both Senior and Junior Team. This is the 2nd year in a row the school has achieved that.
- In 2009, the first Student Leaders Council won the Gold Award from the National Youth Council for their Community Involvement Programme to Batam.
