= William S. W. Lim =

Singaporean architect (1932–2023)

- 林少偉
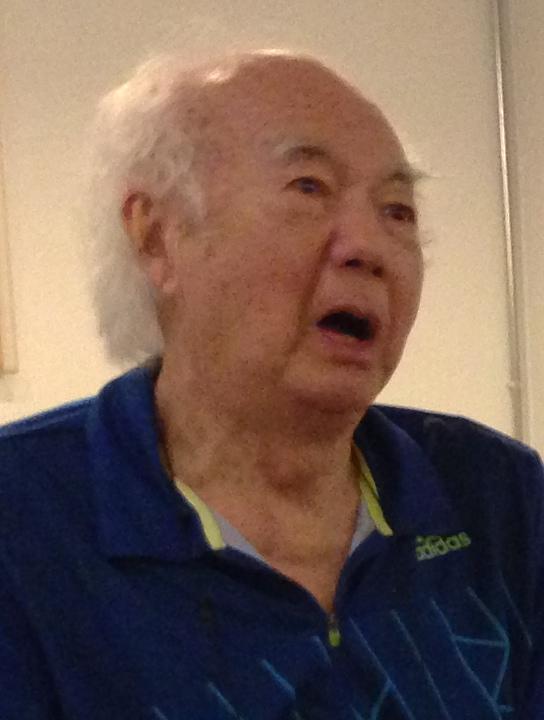
- Lim in 2013
- Born: 19 July 1932; British Hong Kong
- Died: 6 January 2023 (aged 90); Holland Road, Singapore
- Education: Architectural Association School of Architecture; Harvard University
- Occupations: Architect; conservationist
- Known for: Tanglin Shopping Centre (1972); People's Park Complex (1973); Golden Mile Complex (1973)
- Spouse: Lena Lim
- Children: 2

William S. W. Lim
- Traditional Chinese: 林少偉
- Simplified Chinese: 林少伟
Transcriptions
Standard Mandarin
- Hanyu Pinyin: Lín Shàowěi
Yue: Cantonese
- Jyutping: Lam^{4} Siu^{2} Wai^{5}
Southern Min
- Hokkien POJ: Lîm Siáu-úi

William Lim Siew Wai (Chinese: 林少偉; 19 July 1932 – 6 January 2023), commonly known as William S. W. Lim, was a Singaporean architect and conservationist. Some of his noted designs included the Tanglin Shopping Centre (1972), the People's Park Complex (1973), and the Golden Mile Complex (1973), all in Singapore. Lim wrote and lectured on a wide range of subjects relating to architecture, urbanism, and culture in Asia as well as on current issues relating to the postmodern, glocality, and social justice. He was the author of Asian Alterity: With Special Reference to Architecture and Urbanism through The Lens of Cultural Studies (2008), as well as editor of Asian Design Culture (2009) and co-editor of Non West Modernist Past (2011).

== Early life and education ==
Lim was born on 19 July 1932 in British Hong Kong; his father was Richard Lim Chuan Hoe, a lawyer who served as deputy speaker in chief minister David Marshall's government. Lim's older brother, Arthur, was an ophthalmologist and artist. Lim graduated from the Architectural Association School of Architecture in London in 1955 and continued his graduate studies at Harvard University's Department of City and Regional Planning in the United States in the late 1950s as a Fulbright Fellow.

He had briefly worked for a year in London in their County Council. After completing his studies at Harvard, Lim returned to Singapore in 1957, where he did his apprenticeship at James Ferrie. He told The Straits Times in 1997 that he never intended to be an architect, instead being a "process of elimination" as he "didn't want to become a lawyer, priest, teacher or doctor."

== Career ==
In 1960, he founded the architecture firm Malayan Architects Co-Partnership (MAC) alongside Chan Voon Fee and Lim Chong Keat. The three of them met at a seminar in the United Kingdom and decided to form a firm together when they returned to Malaya. They were against including their names for the firm's name, instead choosing a group name after being inspired by The Architects Collaborative. In the early days of MAC, they were unable to get any jobs and designed furniture. In 1962, they won a S$3,000 (US$980) prize after submitting the winning design of the to-be-built Trade Union House (present-day Singapore Conference Hall). Their design was praised by law minister K. M. Byrne, and the Trade Union House was constructed at a cost of S$4 million.

Other competitions they participated in included a shopping centre for Ipoh in 1960, the University of Malaya's Great Hall and Administration Buildings in 1962, and the Negeri Sembilan State Mosque in 1963; they won first prize for the latter. In 1965, he was a founding member of the Singapore Planning and Urban Research Group (SPUR), alongside architects Tay Kheng Soon, Chee Soon Wah, Koh Seow Chuan, and Edward Wong. He served as its first chairman from 1966 to 1968. SPUR was known as an "independent think-tank" and frequently commented on issues regarding Singapore's urban planning from the 1960s to 1970s.

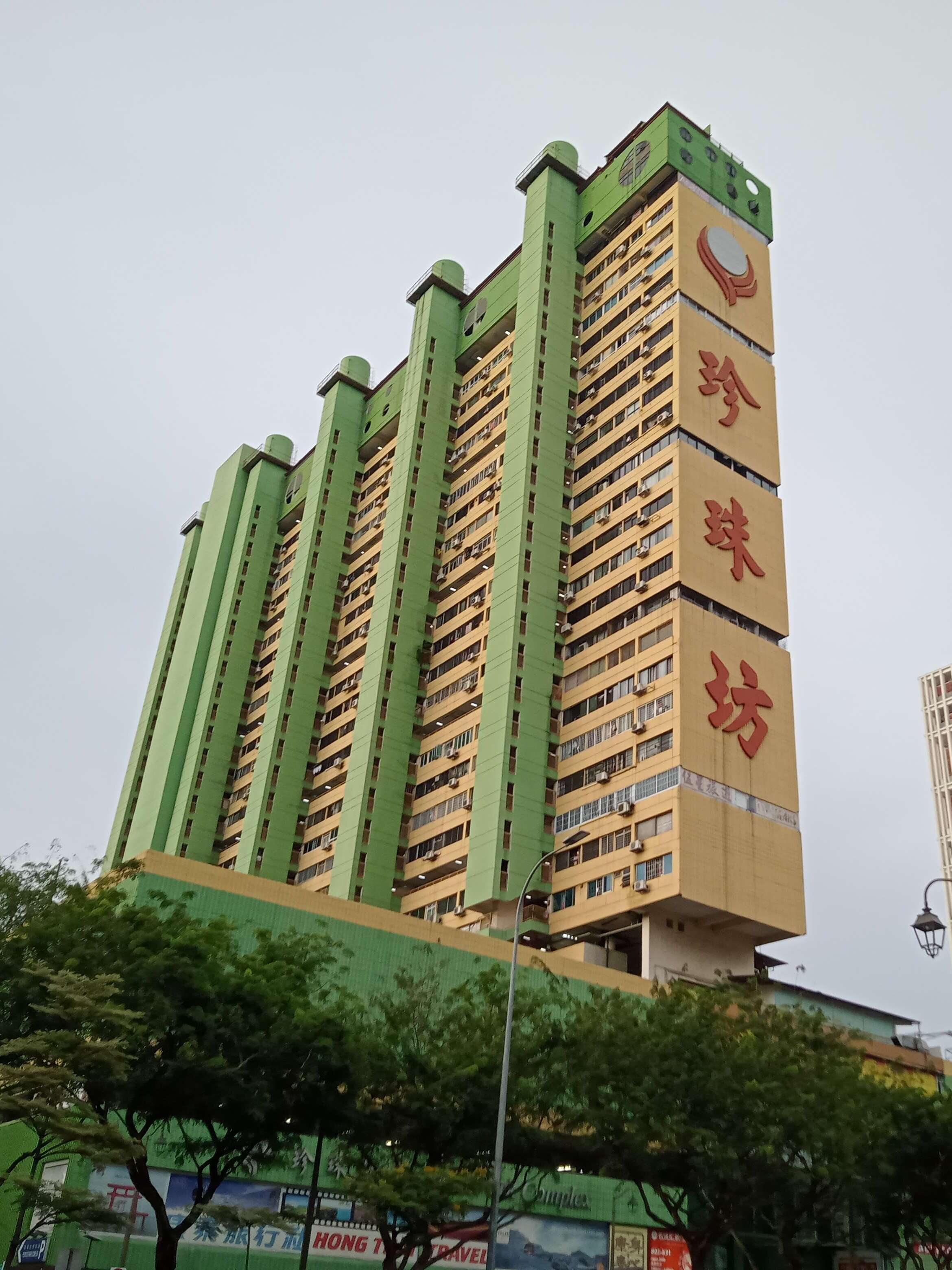
The People's Park Complex

In 1967, Lim founded architecture firm Design Partnership with Tay and Koh, following MAC's dissolution due to incompatibility between members. In 1971, he attended the Second South Pacific Seminar in Fiji, where he presented a paper focusing on urbanisation and migration; he had previously presented papers at the 1967 Second Afro-Asia Housing Congress and at a 1970 UNESCO symposium. In 1972, Lim was a part of the Design Partnership team who designed the People's Park Complex in Chinatown, which became known for its modern and brutalist architecture. It was constructed over a period of years in the 1970s, spreading over 103,740 square feet (9,638 m^{2}) and costing S$40 million (US$16.41 million). The design for the People's Park Complex was the first to feature a multi-storeyed shopping centre with an atrium, which was subsequently repeated in other designs in Singapore.

While designing the People's Park Complex, Lim also designed the Tanglin Shopping Centre, which was later developed by S. K. Chee Co. for S$7.5 million (US$3.05 million) and opened in 1972. In 1973, Lim designed the sixteen-storey tall Golden Mile Complex with Tay and Gan Eng Oon, and it was completed in 1973. It similarly incorporated brutalist architecture and was described as a "vertical city". Around this time, he also worked on Katong Shopping Centre. The People's Park Complex and the Golden Mile Complex were Lim's most well-known buildings that he designed with Design Partnership. In 1974, following Tay's departure from Design Partnership to start his own firm, Lim and Koh reestablished the firm as DP Architects in 1975.

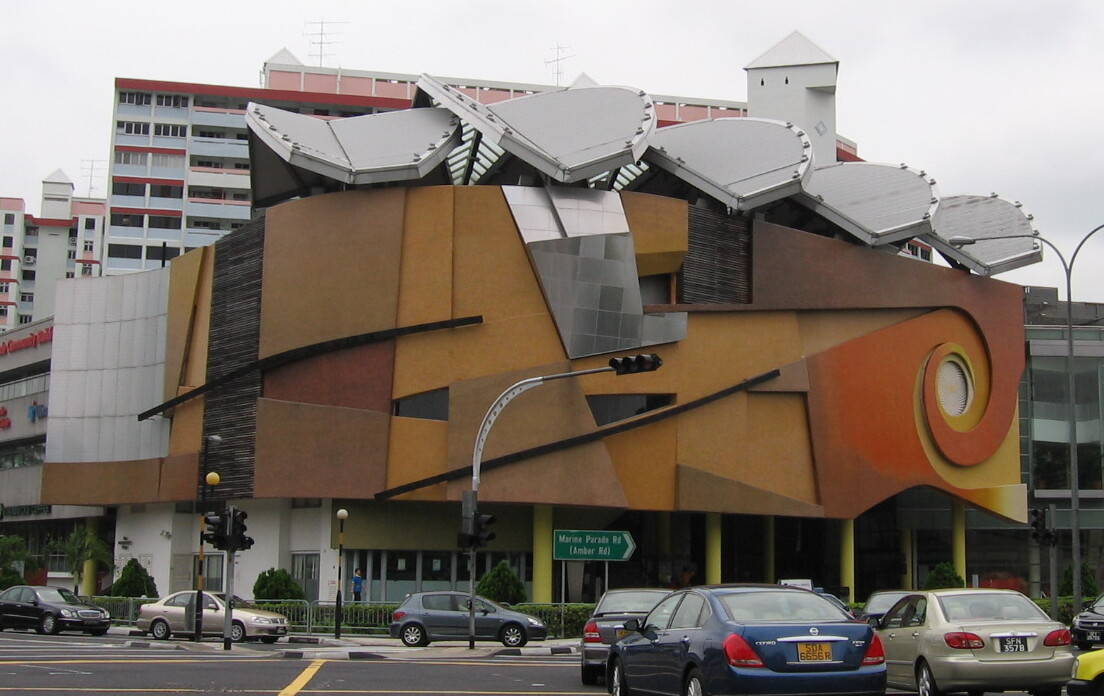
The Marine Parade Community Centre

In 1975, Lim was reported to be working as a part-time lecturer on architecture at the National University of Singapore. He also supported the Area Licensing Scheme. Around this time, Lim was growing uninterested in modernist architecture and began experimenting with post-modernism. This was seen in certain buildings he designed such as the Ken Thai House and Unit 8, built in 1979 and 1984, respectively. Lim described these as "disrupting the hierarchy" of structure and power displayed in modernist architecture, as shown in the layered space and nonconforming to the planning grids. In 1981, he left DP Architects and started his own business – William Lim Associates – with Mok Wei Wei, Richard Ho, and Carl Larson. Afterwards, he worked on the Church of Our Saviour in 1987, the Tampines North Community Centre in 1989, the Marine Parade Community Centre in 2000, and the Gallery Hotel in 2001.

He was a founding member of the Singapore Heritage Society and a co-founder and chairman of Asian Urban Lab and President of the Architectural Association of Asia (AA Asia). He was conferred an honorary degree of Doctor of Architecture by the Royal Melbourne Institute of Technology in 2002 and appointed honorary professor of Lasalle College of the Arts in 2005. In 2003, Lim retired from William Lim Associates, and it was renamed to W Architects by Mok. Lim wrote and lectured on a wide range of subjects relating to architecture, urbanism, and culture in Asia as well as on current issues relating to the postmodern, glocality, and social justice. He was the author of Asian Alterity: With Special Reference to Architecture and Urbanism through The Lens of Cultural Studies (2008), as well as editor of Asian Design Culture (2009) and co-editor of Non West Modernist Past (2011).

== Personal life ==
Lim was married to Lena Lim. The couple had two children: a son and a daughter.

Lim died on 6 January 2023 (Note: There is some confusion with Lim's date of death. The Straits Times reported that his date of death was 6 January 2023. However, Channel News Asia, based on a statement from the Singapore Heritage Society, reported that his date of death was on 7 January.) at his home in Holland Road, Singapore, aged 90. He had previously suffered from COVID-19 in late-2022.

== Works ==
- 1972 – Tanglin Shopping Centre, Singapore
- 1973 – People's Park Complex, Singapore
- 1973 – Golden Mile Complex, Singapore
- 1987 – Church of Our Saviour (conversion), Singapore
- 2000 – Marine Parade Community Building, Singapore
- 2000 – Gallery Hotel, Singapore
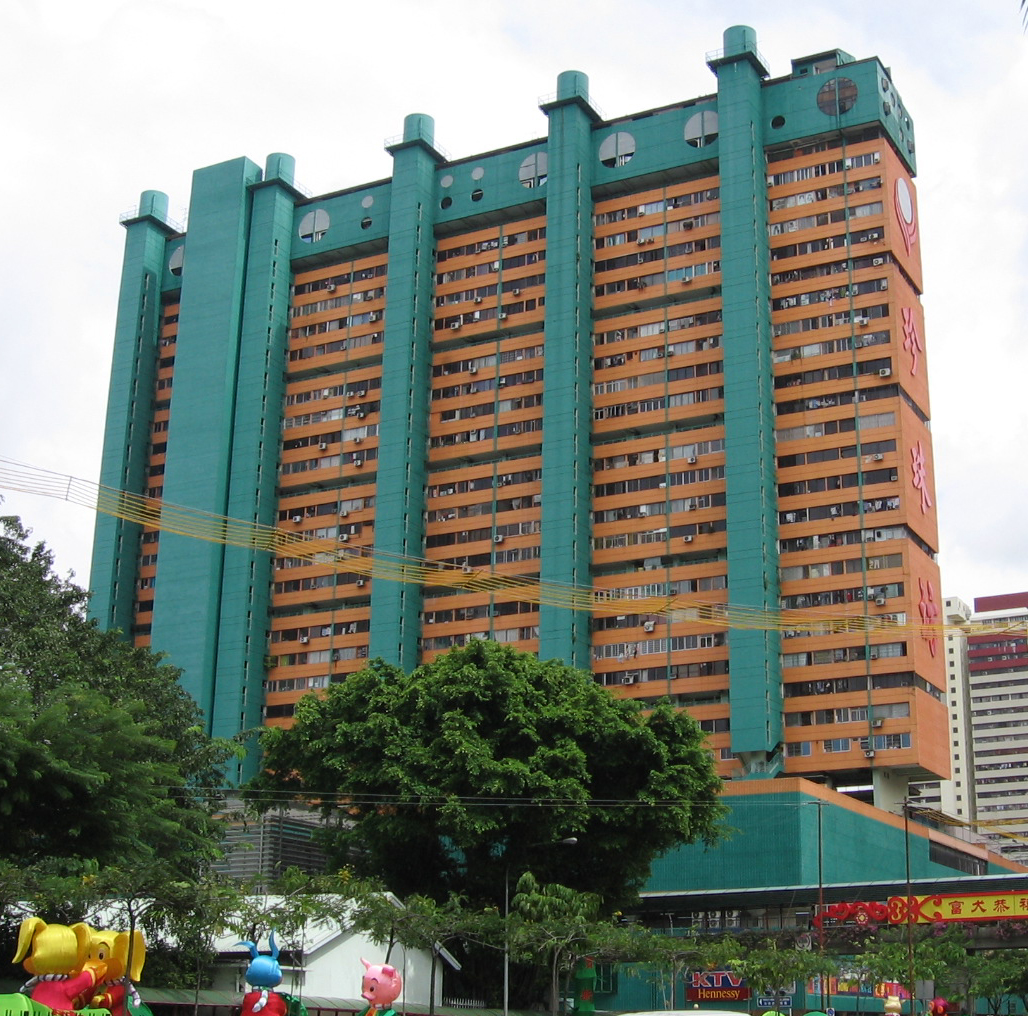
People's Park Complex, Singapore

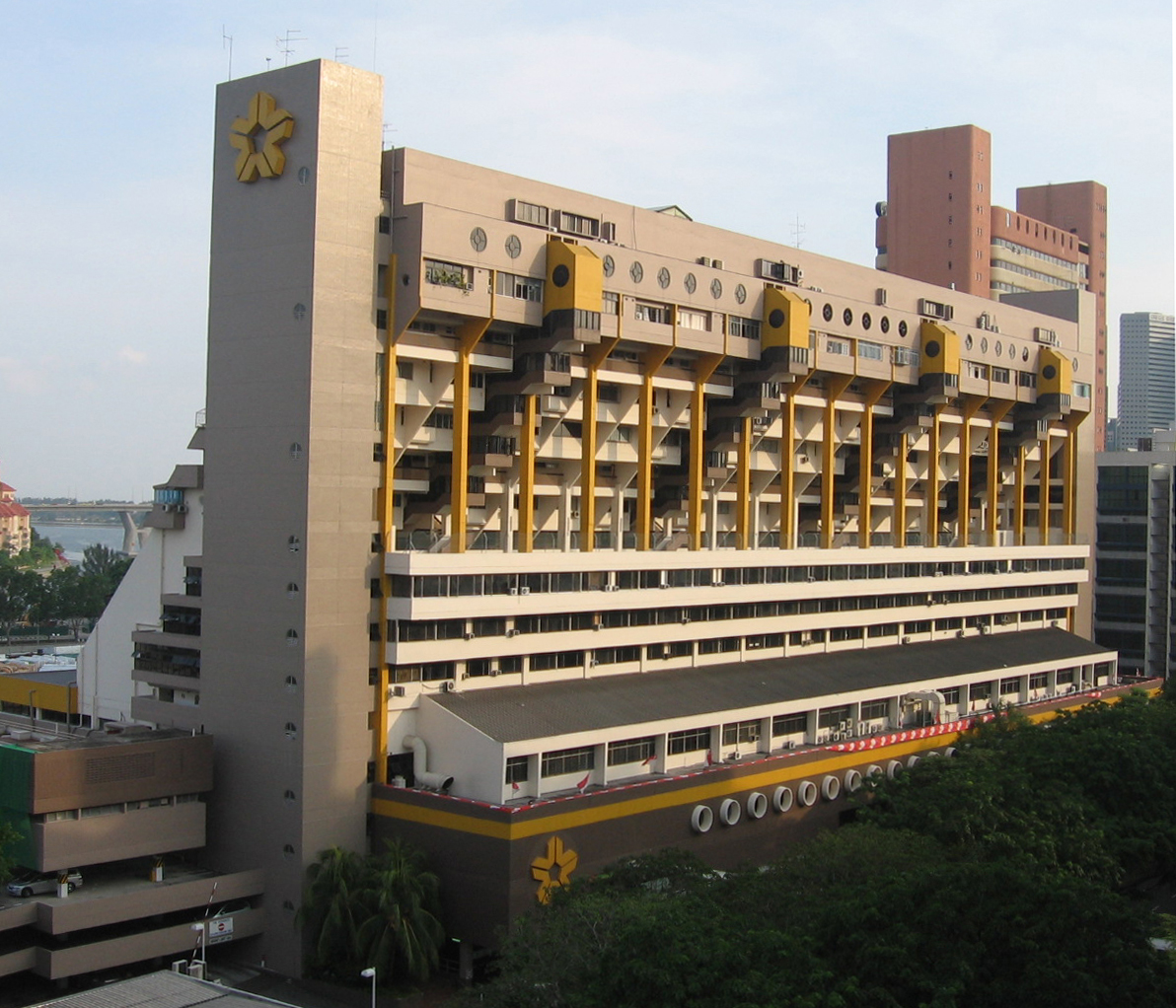
Golden Mile Complex, Singapore

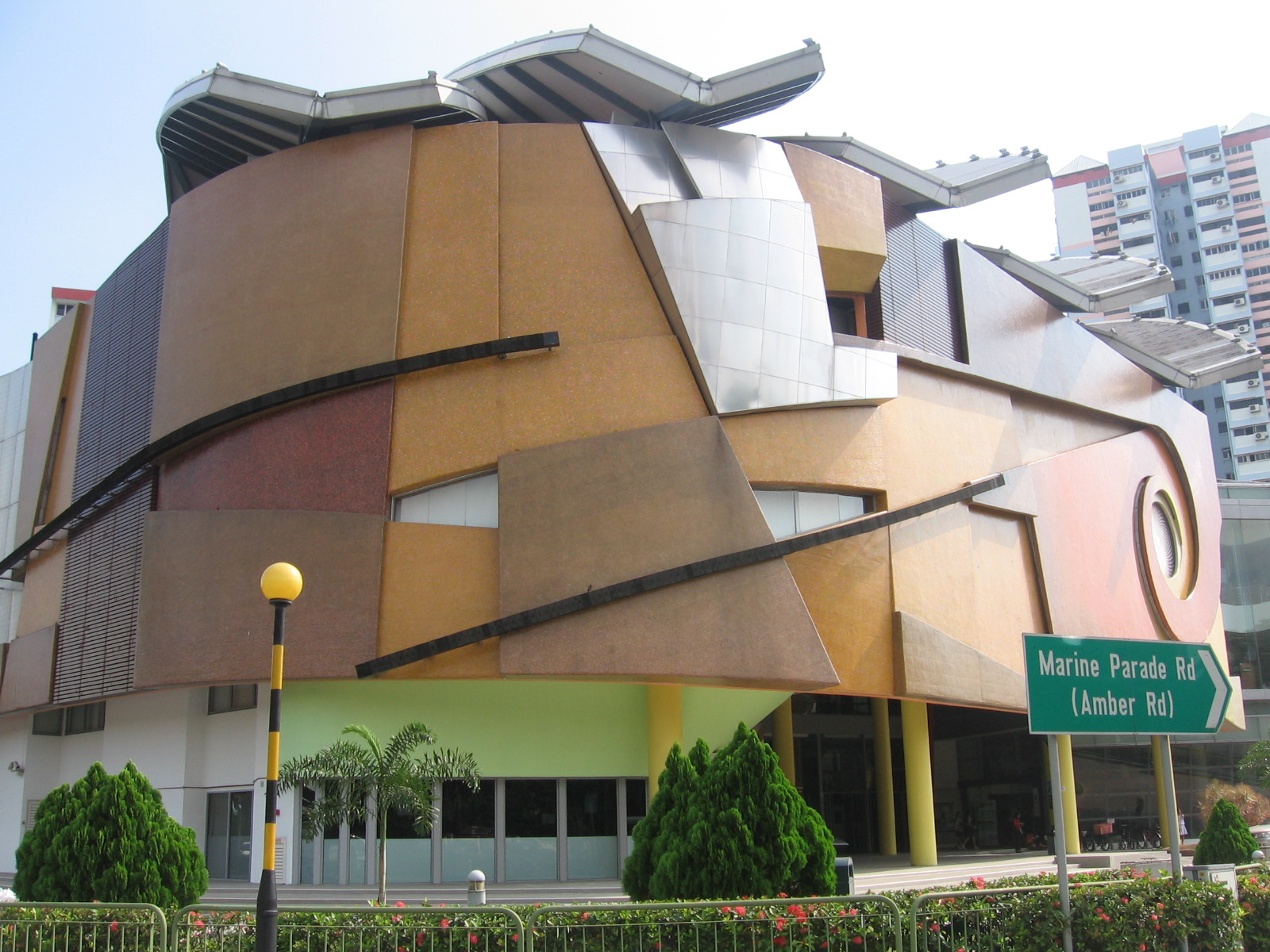
Marine Parade Community Centre, Singapore

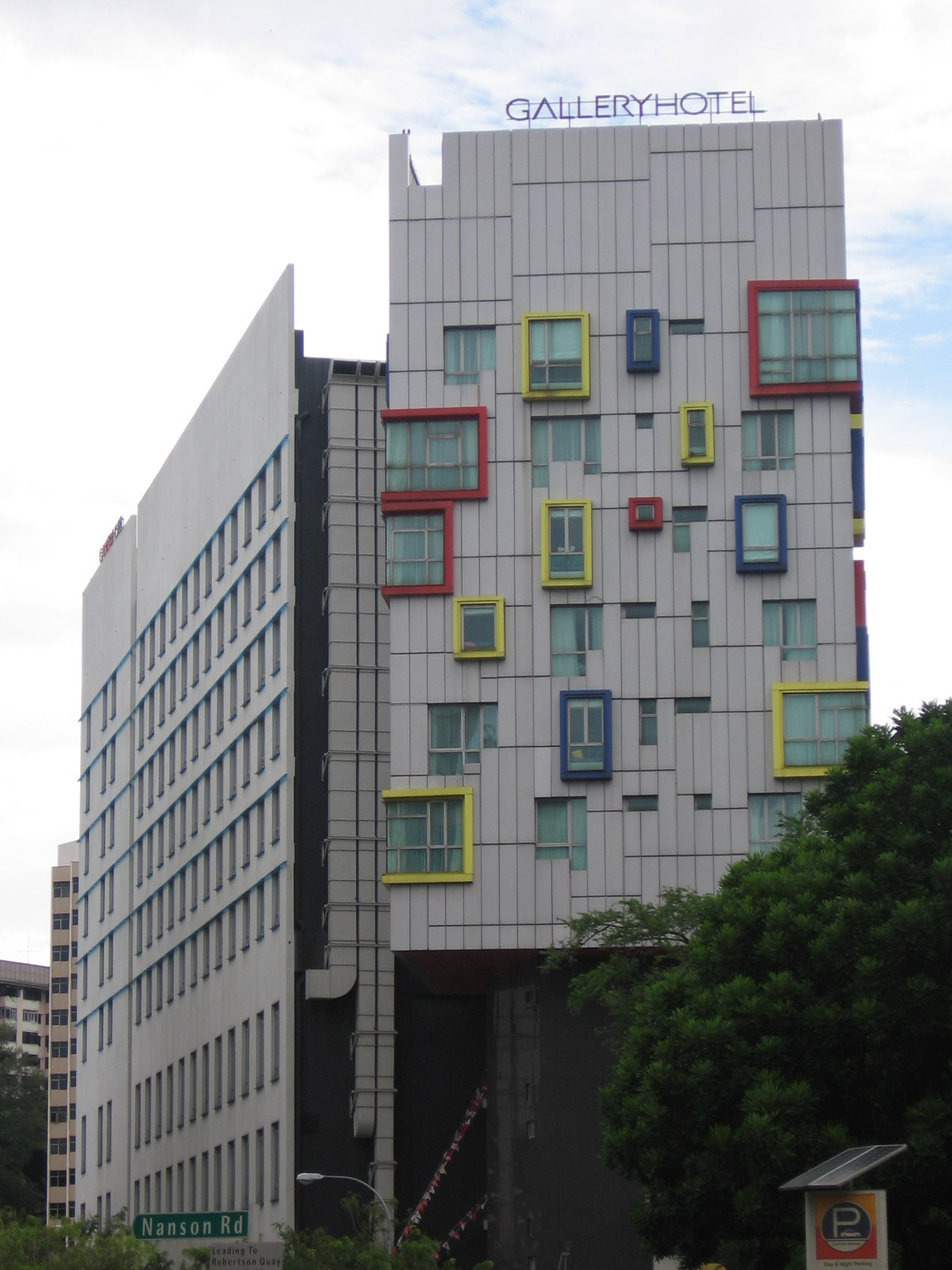
Gallery Hotel, Singapore

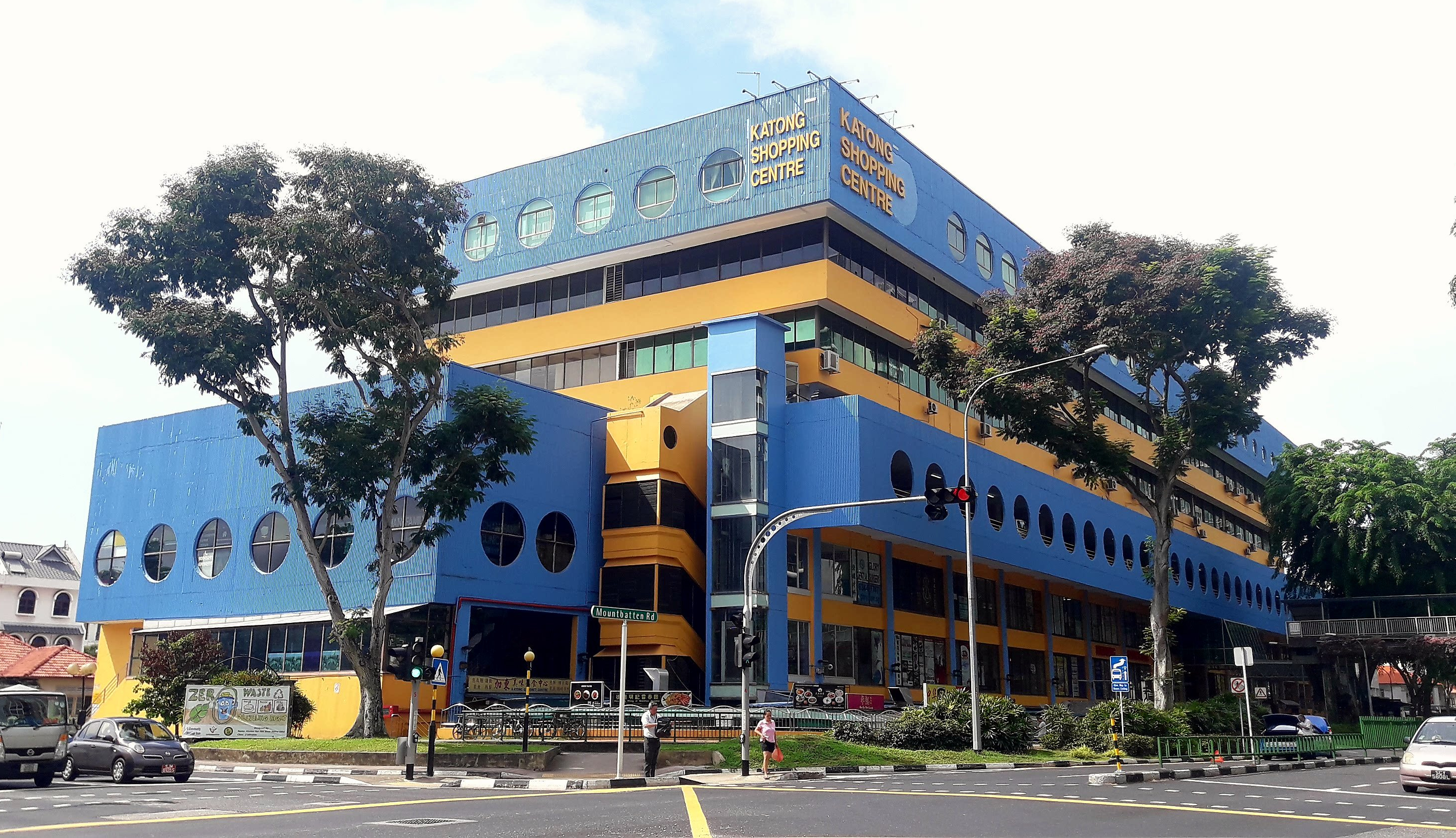
Katong Shopping Centre, Singapore

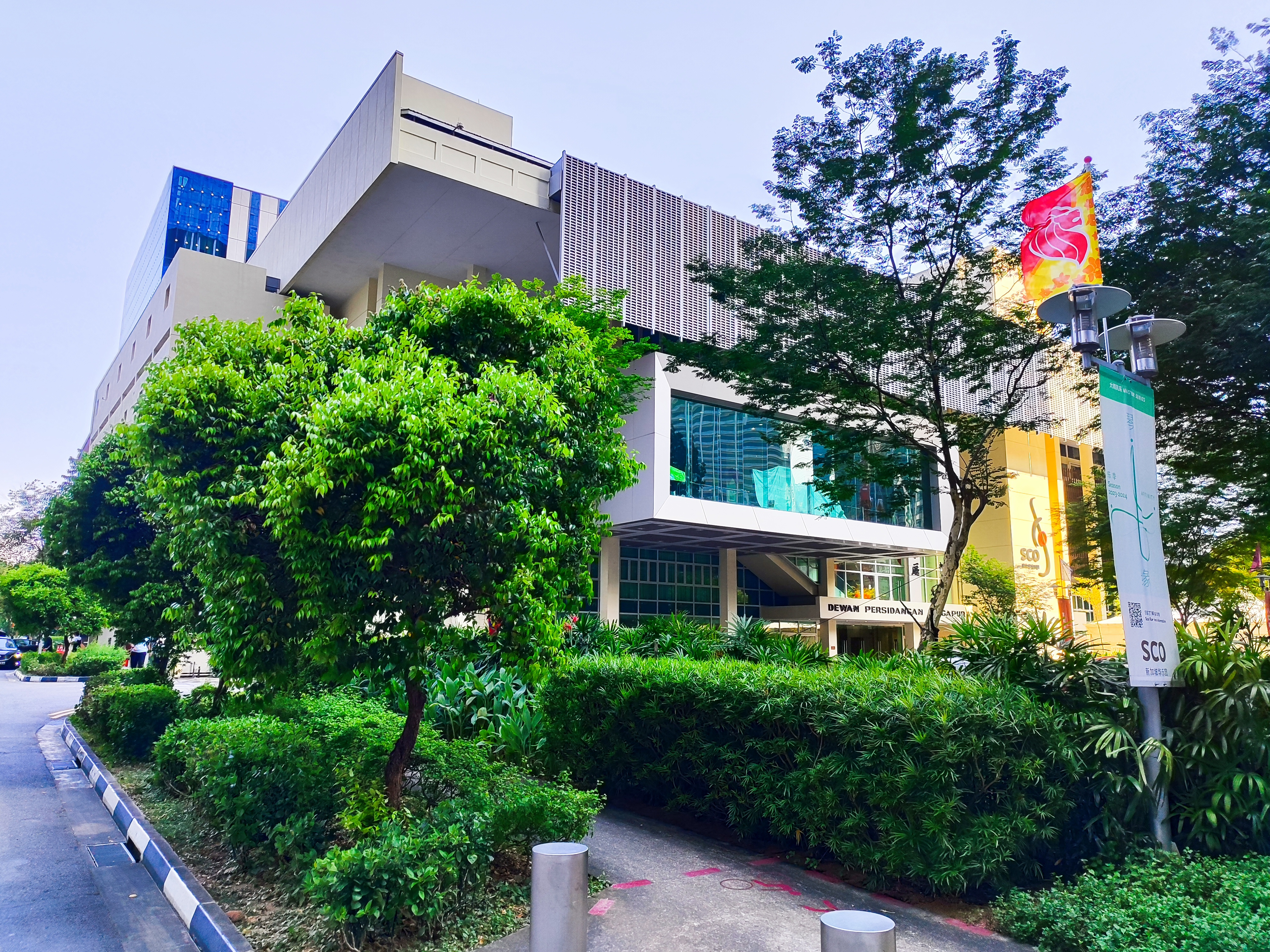
Singapore Conference Hall, Singapore

== Bibliography ==
- Lim, William Siew Wai (1990). Cities for People : Reflections of a Southeast Asian Architect. Select Books. ISBN 981-00-1742-1. OCLC 851071649.
- Lim, William Siew Wai (1998). Contemporary Vernacular : Evoking Traditions in Asian Architecture. Select Books. ISBN 981-00-8370-X. OCLC 38464755.
- Lim, William Siew Wai (1998). Asian New Urbanism and Other Papers. Select Books. ISBN 981-4022-01-2. OCLC 231854270.
- Lim, William Siew Wai (2005). Asian Ethical Urbanism : A Radical Postmodern Perspective. World Scientific Pub. ISBN 981-256-313-X. OCLC 123237679.
- Lim, William Siew Wai (2008). Asian Alterity : With Special Reference to Architecture and Urbanism Through the Lens of Cultural Studies. World Scientific. ISBN 978-981-270-771-0. OCLC 845168576.
- Lim, William Siew Wai (2012). Incomplete Urbanism: A Critical Urban Strategy for Emerging Economies. World scientific. ISBN 978-981-4383-86-8. OCLC 800905300.
