= Koh Seow Chuan =

Singaporean architect (born 1939)

- Born: 1939 (age 85–86); Singapore
- Education: University of Melbourne
- Occupation: Architect

Koh Seow Chuan (born 1939, in Singapore) is a founder of DP Architects, a philatelist, and philanthropist.

== Biography ==
=== Education and career ===
Koh graduated with a Bachelor of Architecture from the University of Melbourne in 1963. He worked in Malayan Architects Co-Partnership before joining William S.W. Lim and Tay Kheng Soon to establish Design Partnership in 1967. Design Partnership was subsequently renamed DP Architects in 1975.

Koh, a member of the Royal Institute of British Architects, was given the RIBA International Award in 2005 and the President's Design Award in 2006 for his work on Esplanade - Theatres on the Bay.

His other notable projects include People's Park Complex.

=== Philately ===
He is an avid collector of stamps, historical documents, old postcards, cultural artefacts, maps, photographs, antique books and art pieces, and has exhibited or donated many of these. Some of his collections, including photographs and postcards which dates from the 1880s, is on display at the Singapore Philatelic Museum.

Koh served as President of the Singapore Stamp Club in 1967. From 1971 to 1974, he helped to establish the Federation of Inter-Asian Philately (FIAP), and held the position of General Secretary on the pro tem executive committee.

He was one of the founders of the Association of Singapore Philatelists and held the position of President in 1989. He is currently an honorary member on their governing council.

Koh was the Vice-President of the organising committee of the Singapore World Stamp Exhibition in 1995.

== Philanthropy ==
In 2003, Koh donated 150 paintings by Singaporean artist Lim Tze Peng to the Singapore Art Museum.

He donated 63 artworks by Wong Keen, a Singapore Abstract Expressionist, worth S$1.27 million to the Singapore Art Museum in 2007.

In 2007 he donated 2,231 items of mainly late 19th and early 20th century rare documents of the Straits Settlements and Singapore. In 2008, Mr Koh made a second donation of about 400 out of print and rare books and 68 rare maps.

Singapore Art Museum names gallery after him in honour of his contributions

Part of his collection is in The Koh Seow Chuan Collection at the National Library.

Koh received the Patron of Heritage Award in 2006, Distinguished Patron of Heritage in 2008, and Patron of Heritage again in 2009.

He is a member of the National Heritage Board and Chairman of the National Art Gallery.
