= Gallery Hotel =

Hotel in Robertson Quay, Singapore

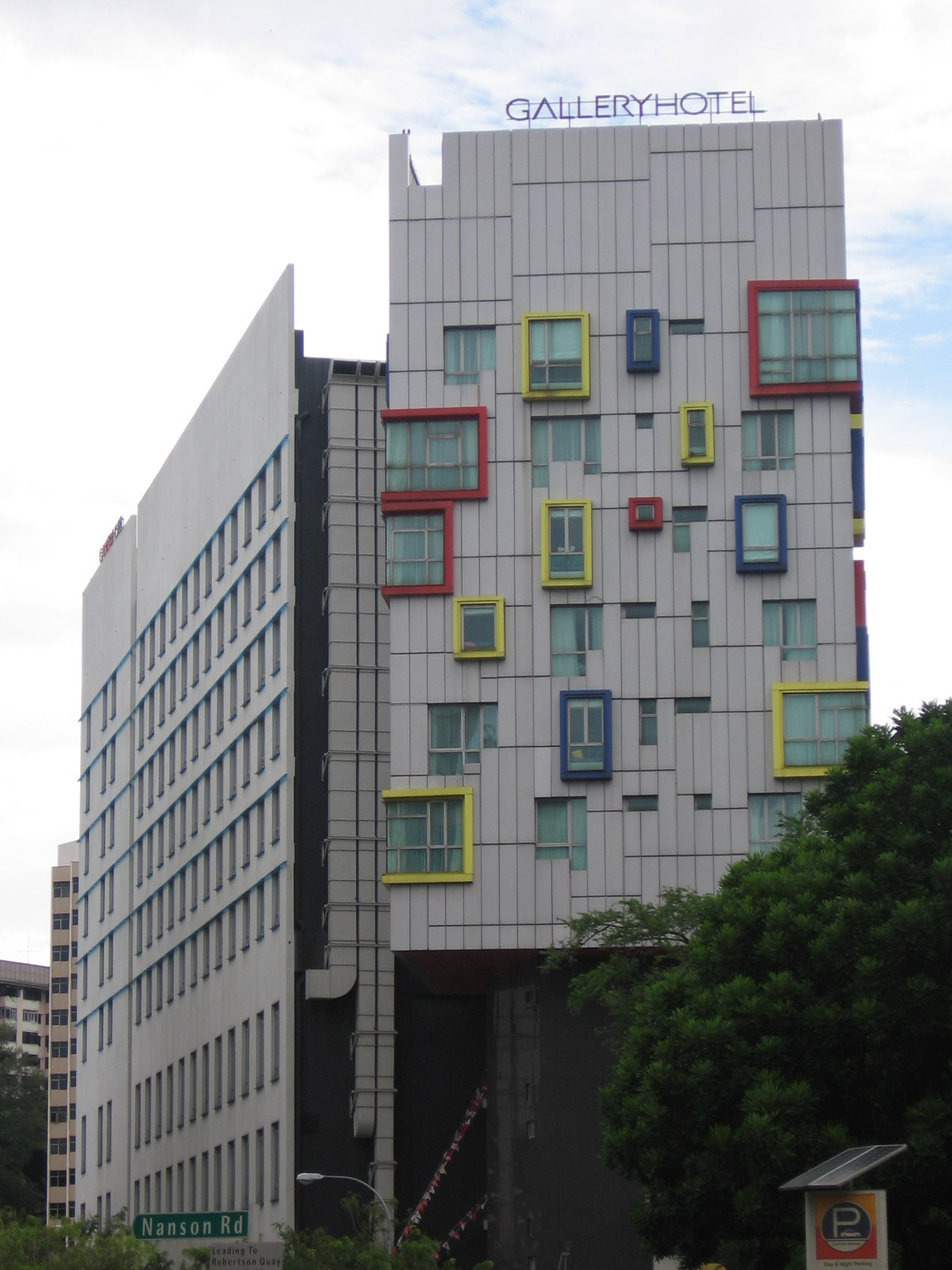

General information
- Location: Robertson Quay, Singapore River, Singapore
- Coordinates: 1°17′25.3″N 103°50′19.0″E
- Opening: 2000
- Owner: Robertson Quay Investments

Design and construction
- Architects: William Lim Associates, Tangguanbee Architects
- Developer: Robertson Quay Investments

Other information
- Number of rooms: 223

Website
- galleryhotel.com.sg

Gallery Hotel (Chinese: 佳乐丽酒店; pinyin: Jiālèlì jiǔdiàn) was a four-star boutique hotel at Robertson Quay on Singapore River, in the Central Area of Singapore. Originally known as Gallery Evason Hotel, it was the first "HIP" (Highly Individual Places) hotel in Singapore, and the second in Asia, the first being in Japan.

The InterContinental Singapore Robertson Quay replaced Gallery Hotel since late 2017.

== History ==
The Gallery Hotel was built on a 3,361 square metre (36,178 square feet) site in Robertson Quay, cleared of old warehouses when the area was designated for redevelopment by the Urban Redevelopment Authority in the late 1990s.

The hotel was originally known as Gallery Evason Hotel, but dropped the "Evason" name in January 2002, when Six Senses Hotels, Resorts And Spas, which used to manage the hotel and owned the Evason brand, withdrew from the management.

Constructed at a cost of S$38.9 million by developer and owner Robertson Quay Investments, the Gallery Hotel was completed in 2000 and opened on 11 September that year.

In 2017, the Gallery Hotel was closed and an InterContinental hotel was opened in its building.

== Architecture ==
=== Highly individual places ===
The Gallery Hotel was conceptualised as a "HIP" (Highly Individual Places) hotel. This class of hotel was identified and classified by writer and photographer Herbert Ypma through two publications, HIP Hotels: City (1999) and HIP Hotels: Escape (2000). Associated with designers such as Philippe Starck, Terence Conran and Anouska Hempel, these hotels were defined by Ypma as an alternative to what he called the "dreary sameness of chain hotels and the stuffy pomposity of traditional 'grand' hotels".

Local architectural firms William Lim Associates and Tangguanbee Architects, led by architects William S.W. Lim, Tang Guan Bee and Teh Joo Heng, designed the Gallery Hotel. In 1990, the developer, Robertson Quay Investments, had approached the firms' two principal architects who suggested the HIP hotel idea.

Together with the developer, the architects sought to design the Gallery Hotel, like other HIP hotels, as more than a temporary abode, but to be a destination itself.

The Gallery Hotel has been listed in The Phaidon Atlas of Contemporary Architecture along with works by architects like Herzog & de Meuron, Frank Gehry and Tadao Ando. It is also featured in Ypma's HIP Hotels: Budget (2001).

=== Pluralistic design ===
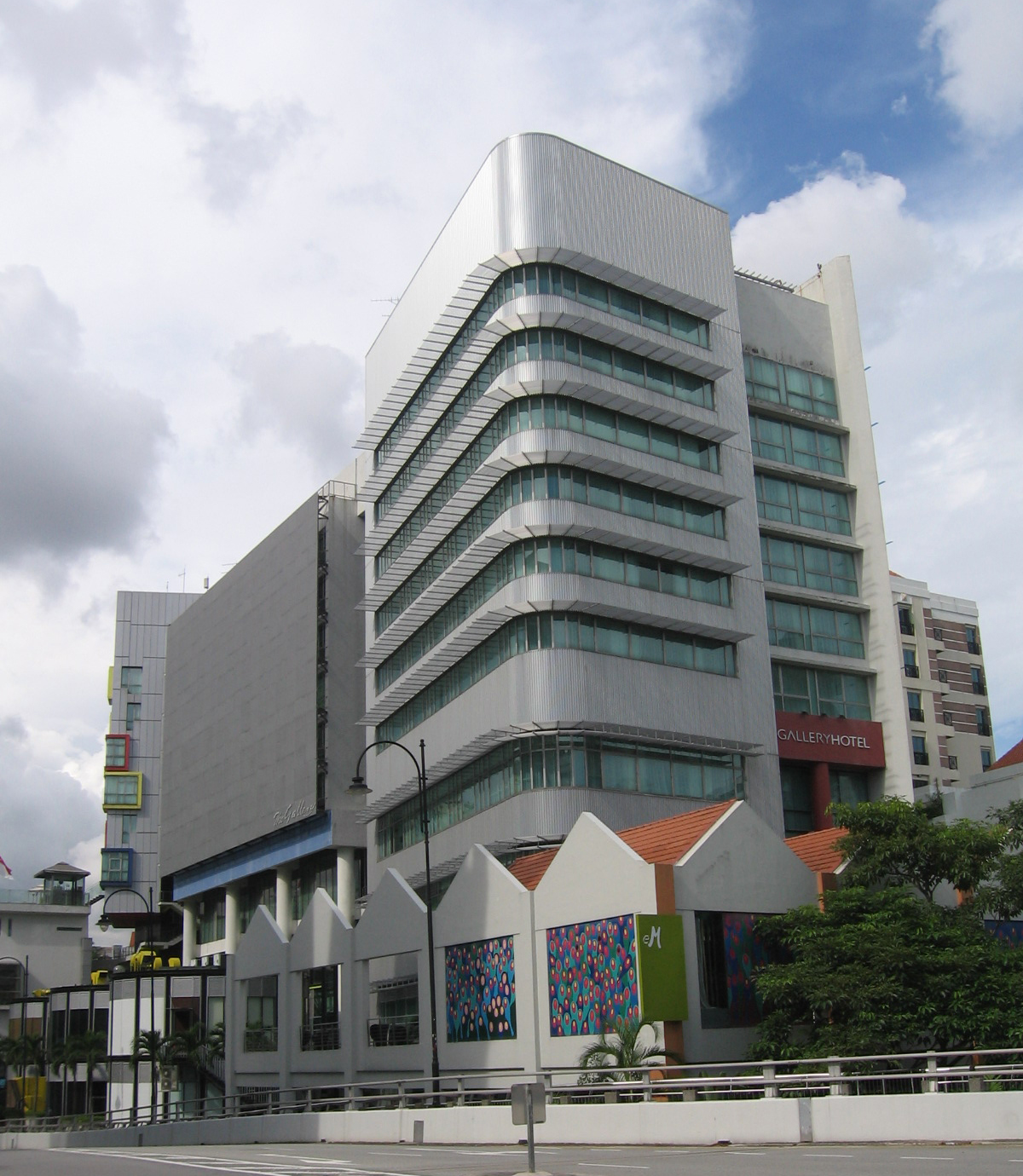
The Gallery Hotel adopts a postmodern pluralistic architectural style, which collages a variety of building forms.

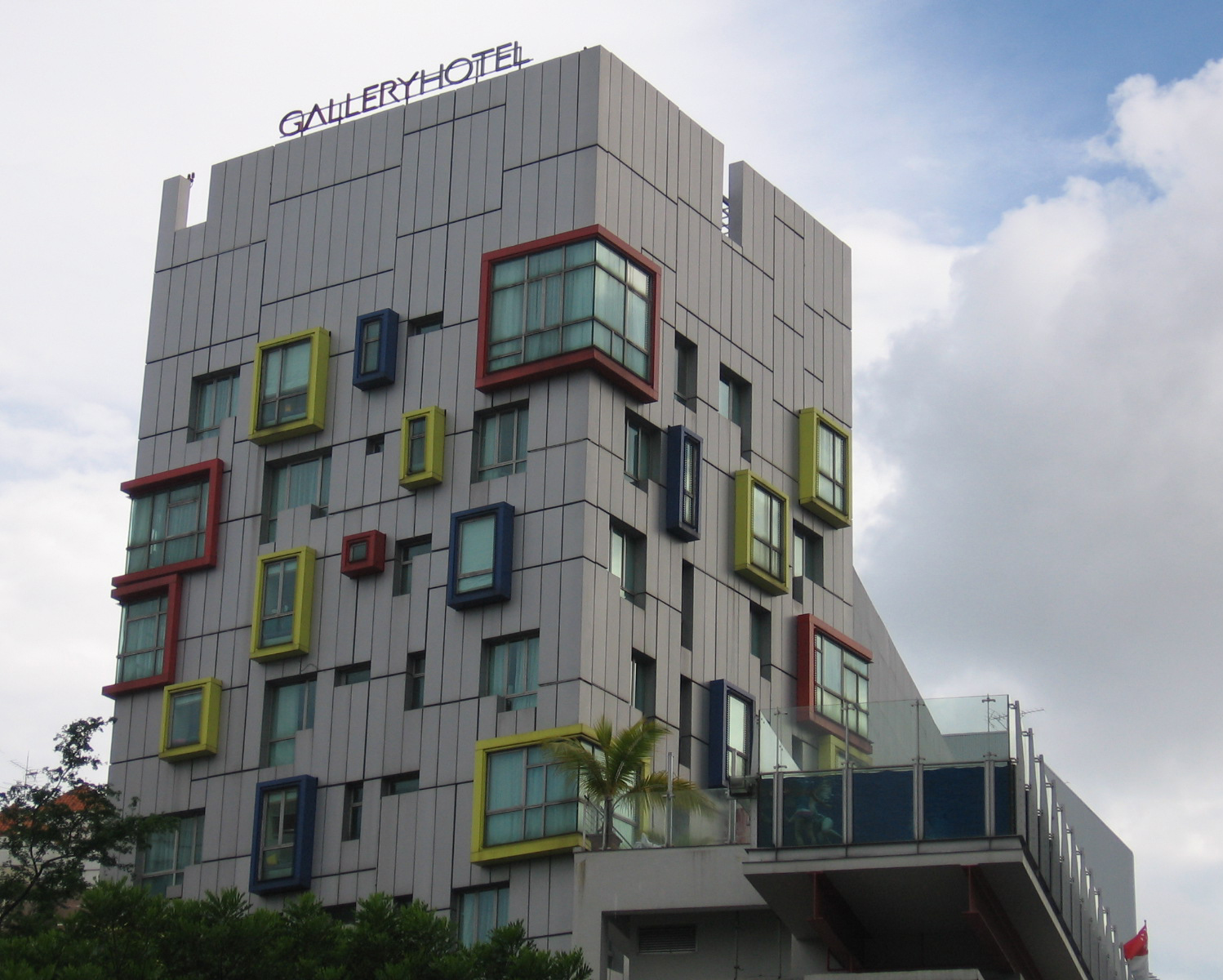
A twisted cuboid form, with random and multi-coloured windows, stands like a pop art signpost at the Mohamad Sultan Road end of the Gallery Hotel. The rooftop lap pool with its cantilevered glass form overlooking the street is the first of its kind in Singapore.

Conceptualised with the HIP objective in mind, the collaboration between the two architectural firms resulted in a postmodern pluralistic collage of experimental building forms. The architecture of the Gallery Hotel consists of several seemingly disjointed, unrelated building forms meshed together. These forms are each disparately expressed and connected by a circulation system of internal streets, gangways and stairways, aiming to give a sense of urban complexity to the scheme. With a narrow end fronting the Singapore River, the architects worked to create a microcosm of the city in the restricted site, rather than a monolithic block.

With a total gross floor area of 14,000 square metres (150,000 square feet), the Gallery Hotel consists of a main building complex divided into three distinct parts, with a series of smaller volumes of incongruent forms interspersed around it. Secondary facilities, such as restaurants and a health club, are located in several building forms not contained within the main complex, but surrounding and attached to the parent hotel block. Attached to one side of the building are three large cylindrical glass and steel structures for food and beverage outlets. The architects' intention was to enhance the building's notion of transparency and interaction between the interior and exterior. The hotel's main building slab is elevated above ground by sitting on a transparent glass-clad lobby. By not adopting the traditional hermetic, inward-looking hotel atrium, the hotel's design is intended to enhance interaction with the surrounding urban environment.

The multi-coloured fenestration on the tower block juxtaposes the building's twisted cuboid form. This was designed to give the tower block the appearance of an oversized piece of pop art fronting Mohamad Sultan Road. These windows appear to be randomly placed, but were placed to maximise the views from the hotel rooms and to protect the privacy of the hotel guests. To complete the postmodern architectural style, one of the building's façades facing Singapore River takes on a warehouse form, mirroring the simple pitched roofs of the old warehouses that used to occupy the area.

The rooftop swimming pool with its cantilevered glass form overlooking the street, the first of its kind in Singapore, is another element in the HIP design. The Gallery Hotel, which collaborated with Lasalle-SIA College of the Arts, is also decorated with works of art, including the neon lights and ashtrays. The treatment of textures is pluralistic, as seen in one of central rectilinear blocks, which is veiled by a perforated steel screen that acts as both a climatic filter and a projection screen.

=== Interior architecture ===
Most of the Gallery Hotel's interior decor was designed by Eva Shivdasani, a Swedish former fashion model, and Bernard Bohnenberger, from Sixth Senses Hotels and Resorts. While the Gallery Hotel's interior architecture embraces the exterior, it also reflects the surroundings through the use of materials. Metallic surfaces reflect the geometric roofs of former warehouses that occupied the area. Pipes and services are exposed in bright primary colours. The entrance foyer consists of an open-air space with a portable desk, like a valet parking kiosk. The smallness of the lobby and the translucency between inside and outside indicate the nature of expected guests, congruent with the concept of HIP hotels not catering to large tour groups.

The Gallery Hotel has been designed as a cyber-age hotel where there is unlimited broadband Internet access. In conference rooms, instead of white-boards, metal surfaces are used for meetings using felt-tipped marker pens.

The fourth floor lobby features a reception desk in an open area next to a restaurant that looks like a garage. Other distinct items of decor include hubcaps to support bar stools and sections of aluminium scaffolding for table legs.

On the guest floors, room numbers are labelled on the floor and wire mesh newspaper racks are fitted on to the wall outside each room. Each floor features original work from the Lasalle-SIA College of the Arts, while all the rooms are individually decorated. The sleeping arrangements of guests were taken into account during the architectural design: Single-bedded rooms, for individuals and couples, have translucent glass panes instead of solid walls separating bathroom and bedroom. There are also women-only floors, where male staff are not allowed.
