= DP Architects =

Architecture and urban design practice in Singapore

DP Architects Pte Ltd
- Company type: Private Limited
- Industry: Architecture and Urban Planning
- Founded: 1967
- Headquarters: Singapore
- Number of locations: 18 Offices
- Area served: Worldwide
- Key people: Angelene Chan (Chairman); Seah Chee Huang (Chief Executive Officer); Lee Shee Koeng (Chief Operating Officer)
- Services: Architecture, Planning, Interior design, Project management, Development feasibility study, Due diligence study, Environmental sustainability design, Engineering, Infrastructure design, Master planning, Architectural lighting design, Facade design
- Number of employees: Over 900 worldwide
- Website: www.dpa.com.sg

DP Architects Pte Ltd is a Singaporean multinational architectural design firm. Originally founded as Design Partnership in 1967, it became a private limited company in 1993 and now operates as a multi-disciplinary design consultancy. It is recognized as one of the largest architectural practices globally.

The DP group encompasses various entities, including DP Architects, DP Consultants, DP Design, DP Engineers, DP Façade, DP Green, DP Lighting, DP Sustainable Design, and DP Urban. It operates from 18 offices worldwide and has more than 900 employees.

Projects by the DP group include The Dubai Mall, as well as Singapore landmarks like the People's Park Complex and Golden Mile Complex, both built in the 1960s. The firm has also participated in master planning for the Orchard Road shopping belt and the development of Marina Centre. It is involved in sectors including retail, hotel, resort, commercial office, residential, convention center, technology parks, medical, religious, educational, civic institutions, and airport and aviation-related support facilities.

== History ==
The firm was started in 1967 with William Lim Siew Wai, Tay Kheng Soon, and Koh Seow Chuan when they left the Malayan Architects Co-Partnership and founded Design Partnership after its dissolution to start their own firm with an initial staff strength of 18. In 1972, Gan Eng Oon joined and became a partner followed by Chan Sui Him in 1973 and became a partner subsequently in 1974. In 1974, Tay Kheng Soon, who graduated from Singapore Polytechnic in 1963, retired and established his own practice, Akitek Tenggara. A year later in 1975, Design Partnership was dissolved and reformed as DP Architects Pte (DPA). William Lim retired in 1981 and established his own practice.

The company expanded in 1982 with the establishment of two subsidiary companies, DP Design and DP Consultants. DP Architects was registered formally as a private limited with 200 employees in Singapore. Leading the firm since its inception, Chan was succeeded by Francis Lee Seng Wee in 2004 as the CEO while he was promoted to chairman of the firm. In 2016, Francis Lee Seng Wee became chairman, while Chan assumed a mentorship role as senior director. Angelene Chan was promoted to CEO.

In 2021, as part of the firm's leadership renewal and continuity plan, Seah Chee Huang has been appointed its chief executive officer. Angelene Chan became the chairman of the board while Francis Lee became a senior director and advisor.

== Sustainable design ==
DP Architects is considered a leader in sustainable design. The Building and Construction Authority of Singapore (BCA) has recognized DP Architects as one of the top three architecture firms in Singapore with the highest number of Green Mark Platinum and GoldPlus projects, with 25 or more projects rated Green Mark Gold+ or Platinum. The BCA Green Mark system is a green building rating system to evaluate a building for its environmental impact and performance, with Gold+ and Platinum being the highest two ratings for efficiency. DP Architects has also scored many firsts for sustainably designed architecture, winning the first two Green Mark District awards for Resorts World Sentosa and NUS University Town, both achieving the second highest rating of GoldPlus.

In 2015, DP Architects was awarded the Built Environment Leadership (BEL) Gold Class Award by BCA. DP Architects and its group of companies received a total of four BCA-SGBC Green Building Individual Commendation Awards in 2013, 2014 and 2015.

== Notable projects ==
DPA is best known in Singapore for several architectural works of the late 1960s and early 1970s such as People's Park Complex, and Golden Mile Complex.

Dutch architect Rem Koolhaas said at a press conference when he visited Singapore in 2005: 'These buildings (Golden Mile Complex and People's Park Complex) were not intended to be landmarks, but became landmarks.'

The firm is also known for its work on the Esplanade - Theatres on the Bay, The Dubai Mall, Resorts World Sentosa, and Singapore Sports Hub.
