= Marine Parade Community Building =

Community centre in Singapore

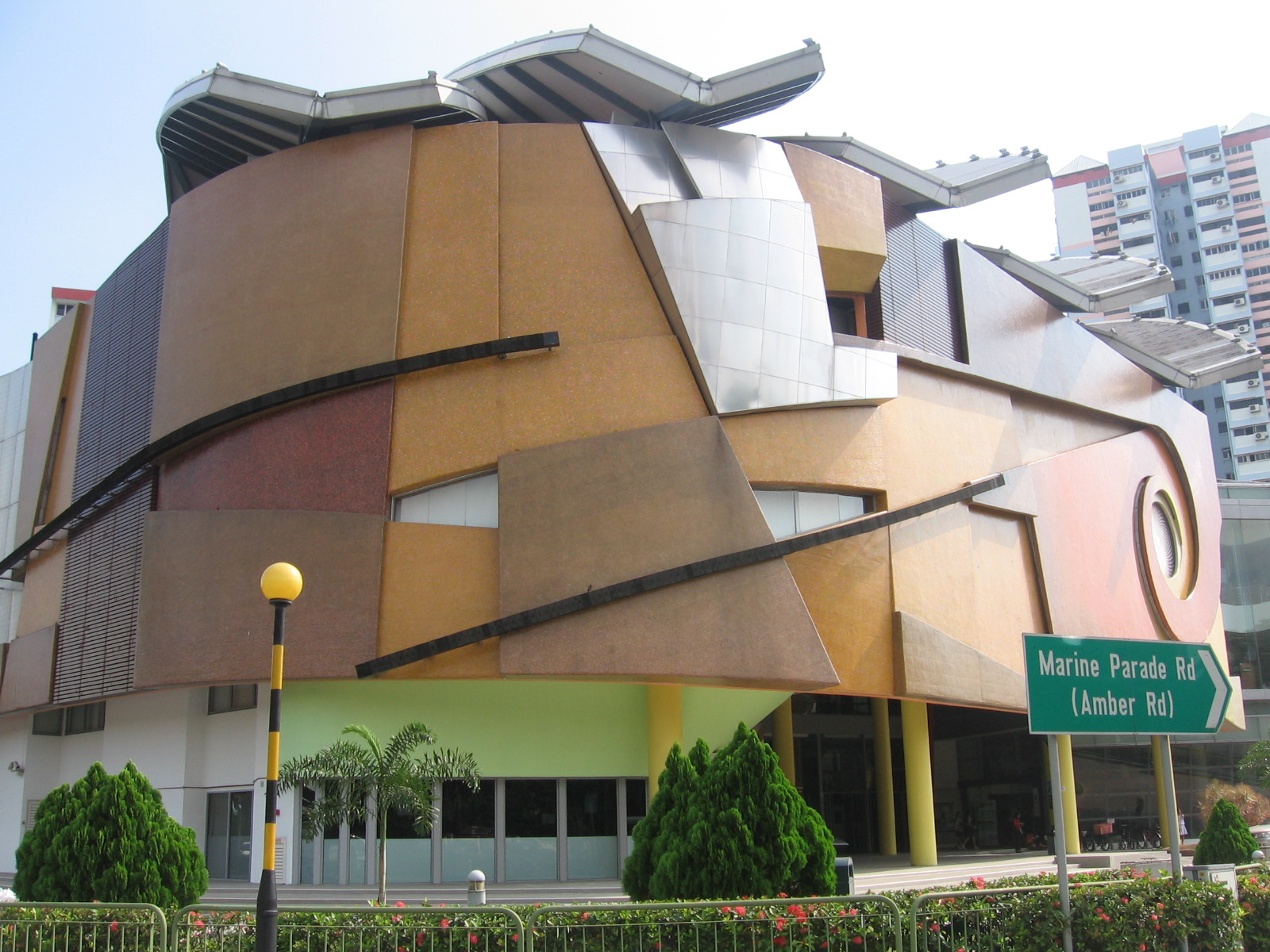
- The Marine Parade Community Building in 2007
- Interactive map of the Marine Parade Community Building area

General information
- Status: Demolished
- Type: Community
- Location: 278 Marine Parade Road, Singapore 449282
- Coordinates: 1°18′18″N 103°54′35″E
- Construction started: 1997; 29 years ago
- Completed: 2000; 26 years ago
- Demolished: 2023; 3 years ago

Technical details
- Floor count: 3, with a mezzanine and a basement

Marine Parade Community Building (Chinese: 马林百列社区综合大厦; pinyin: Mǎlín Bǎiliè shèqū zōnghé dàshà) was a community centre located at 278 Marine Parade Road, Singapore. Opened on 6 March 2000, it housed the formerly separate Marine Parade Community Centre and Marine Parade Public Library, as well as a performing arts group, The Necessary Stage. Designed by William Lim Associates, one of the distinguishing features of the postmodern building was the mural cladding called Texturefulness of Life, which was the largest piece of installation art in Singapore. The building was demolished in 2023 and is being rebuilt.

== History ==
The building sat on reclaimed land first occupied by the Marine Parade Community Centre, which was built in the early 1980s and later renamed to Marine Parade Community Club. In March 1995, the People's Association (PA) announced plans to spend S$9.56 million to upgrade 54 community centres and clubs that were over ten years old, adding facilities such as lifts, dance studios, karaoke rooms and multi-purpose air-conditioned activity rooms, to make community centres more user-friendly, with open concept offices and reception areas.

In June 1995, then-Prime Minister Goh Chok Tong asked PA to study the idea of having community centres share their premises with other civil users such as libraries, government offices and commercial developments. Goh, who is also a Member of Parliament (MP) for Marine Parade Group Representation Constituency (GRC), suggested combining the Marine Parade Community Club, which was slated for upgrading, with the National Library branch in Marine Parade, in a six-storey building with three floors for the community club and three for the library. In June 1996, Wong Kan Seng, PA's deputy chairman, announced that due to the scarcity of land in Singapore, eight of the redeveloped community centres, including Marine Parade Community Club, would be located with other civil users.

As 30% of the upgrading cost had to be paid by the community club, several fundraising activities were carried out for the redevelopment. These activities, which included music concerts, golf tournaments and cyclethons, raised a total of S$6 million. The old club building was demolished in 1997 and construction of the Marine Parade Community Building began the same year. SAL Construction was the project's main contractor. Built at a cost of S$30 million, the new building was completed in January 2000, and was open to the public on 6 March that year. It was officially opened by Goh on 28 May that year.

=== Demolition and new building ===
In 2018, plans were shown to Goh, then-an advisor for the Marine Parade Grassroots Organisation, for a renovation of the building. The building was later scheduled for demolition in 2022, despite calls from the community for it to be preserved. Some argued that the building's mural wall was "iconic" and should "at least be retained and restored". Despite this, the building was closed on 22 June 2022 and was entirely demolished by 2023. A new community building for Marine Parade was planned to be completed by 2025, but was later expected to be finished by early 2026 in a statement from MP for Marine Parade GRC Tan See Leng in April 2025. The new building would feature a self-help area – offering courses on cooking, dance, and music – and multiple eateries. The new building would also link to the Marine Parade MRT station to increase connectivity and house the Marine Parade Public Library.

== Facilities ==
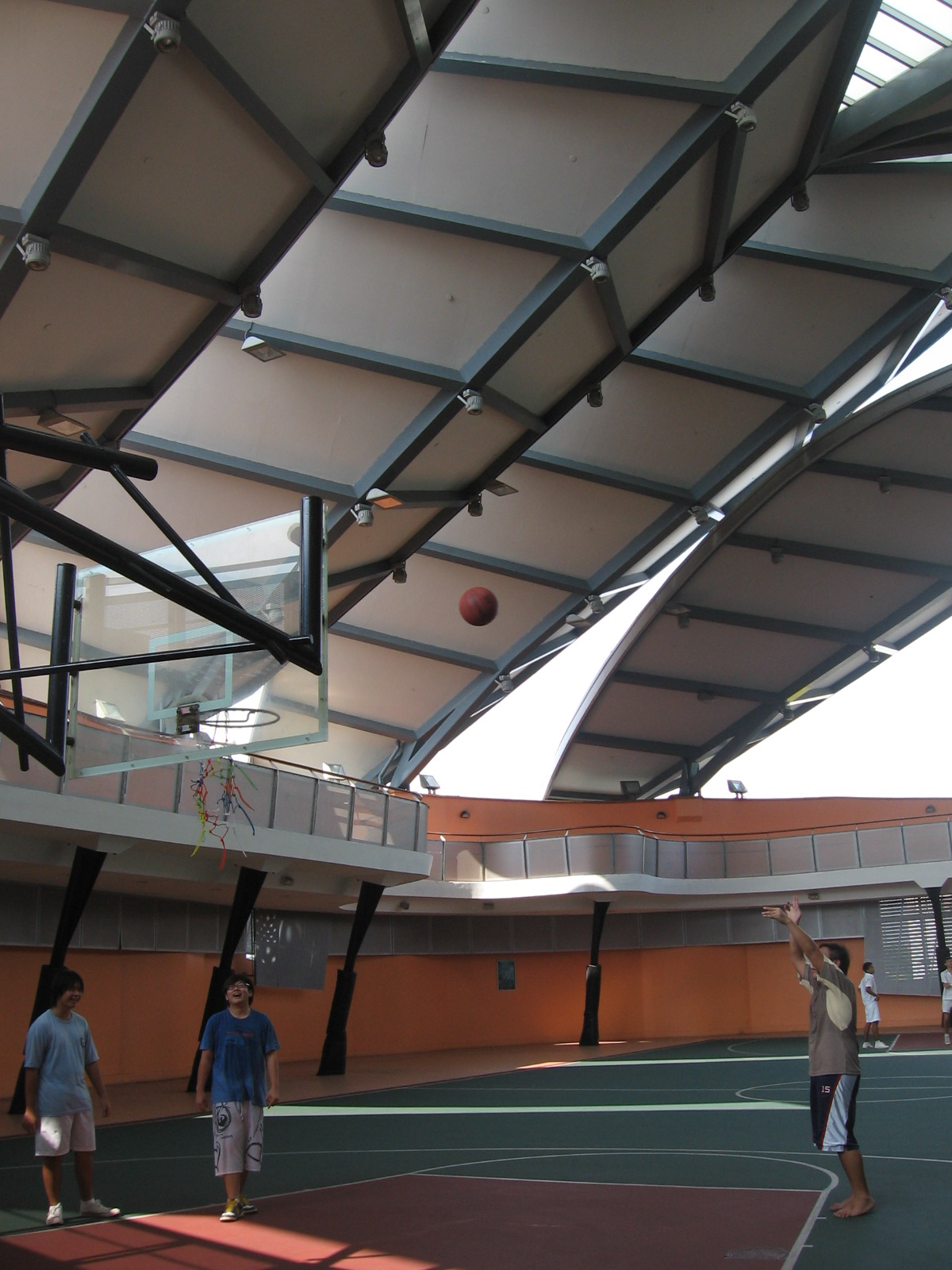
The Marine Parade Community Building's basketball court's roof (pictured) resembled the leaves of a palm tree.

The Marine Parade Community Building housed the Marine Parade Community Club, the Marine Parade Community Library, and a professional theatre company, The Necessary Stage. It also originally had an al fresco Starbucks café on the ground floor.

=== Marine Parade Community Club ===
Opened on 6 March 2000, the Marine Parade Community Club was equipped with a glass-walled gymnasium overlooking part of the East Coast Parkway, a covered basketball court on the rooftop, and an air-conditioned sports hall. There was also a 263-seat theatrette, a roof terrace for gatherings, and music, study, and activity rooms.

=== Marine Parade Public Library ===
Opened on 10 November 1978, the Marine Parade Community Library was originally located at the town centre of Marine Parade Housing Estate before it shifted to its new premises at the community building. The library is Singapore's second-oldest public library and the only one built on reclaimed land. It started moving in stages to the community building in April 2000, and was officially opened by Goh Chok Tong on 28 May that year. The Marine Parade Community Library is the first public library in Singapore to be housed together with a community club and an arts group. The library's old premises was renovated for an NTUC FairPrice supermarket.

The library is spread over four floors of the Marine Parade Community Building, with a floor area of 3,500 square metres (37,675 square feet). As one of the first neighbourhood libraries, the library's entire second floor is its children's book section, featuring murals, trivia, and multimedia tools. The library had more than 150,000 books and 2,500 videos available for loan. There was a café on the ground floor, and the library was fitted with numerous couches and benches for the public's use. Other facilities include multimedia stations, do-it-yourself service stations, and music posts equipped with headphones. It was closed in 2022, in conjunction with the building's scheduled renovation. A 24-hour book dispenser, managed by the National Library Board, was set up to serve the residents during this time.

=== The Necessary Stage ===
The Necessary Stage was the first arts group to be housed in a community building with a community club by Singapore's National Arts Council (NAC). The move was part of the NAC's Arts Housing Scheme that offered alternative locations to arts groups besides old vacant buildings, in line with the PA's plan to repackage its community clubs as fashionable multi-purpose spaces. The Necessary Stage's 672-square metre (7,467 square feet) premises at the basement of the community building was about three times the size of its old premises at Cairnhill Arts Centre, which did not have a proper theatre space for productions. The arts group's facility at the community building featured a "Black Box", a stage-less theatre with flexible seating. The NAC spent S$2.1 million on construction costs for the unit at Marine Parade, which included a foyer and the 120-seat Black Box. The Necessary Stage moved out of the Marine Parade Community Building by 2020.

== Architecture ==
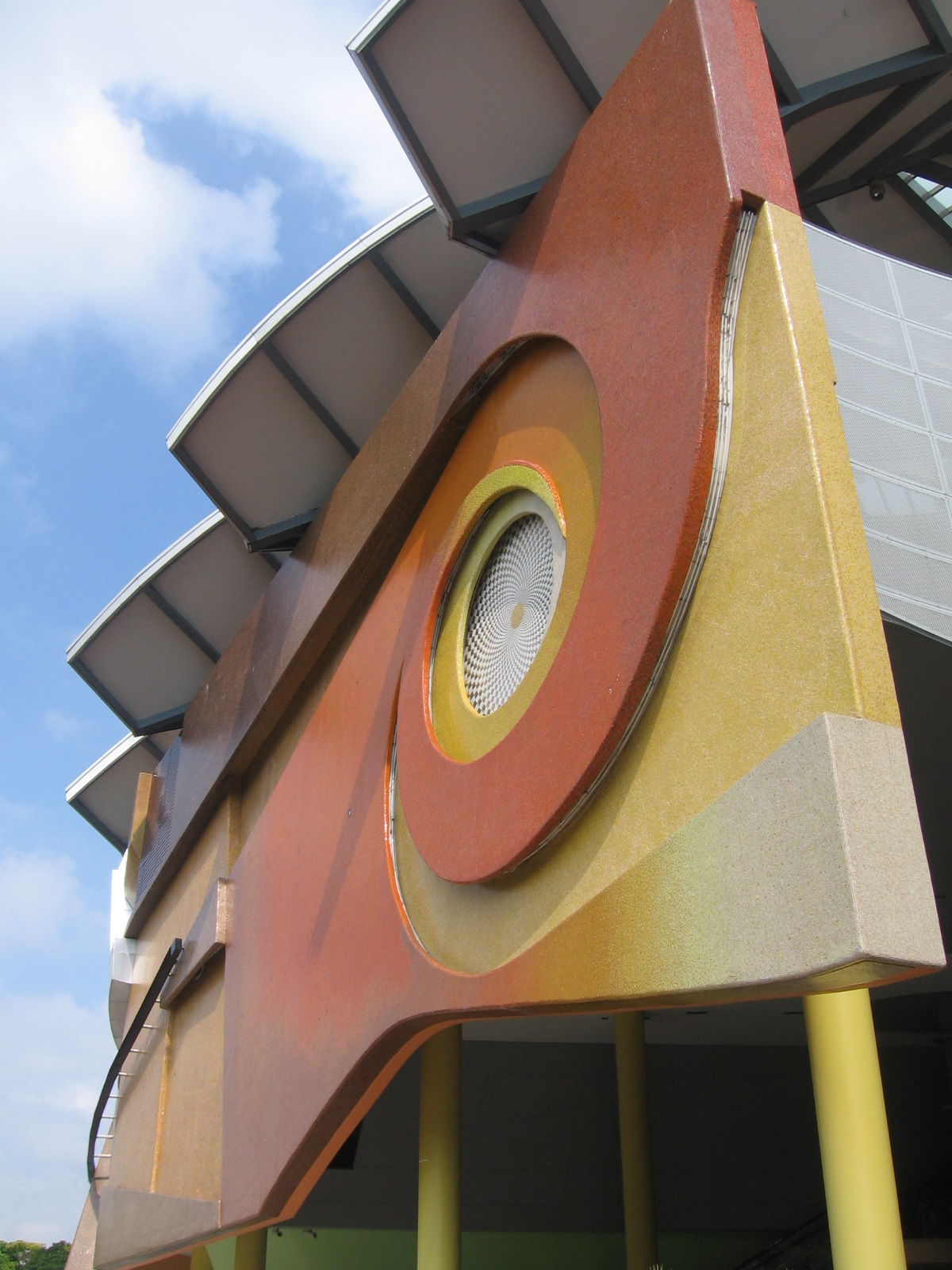
The centrepiece of the wall mural, which was Singapore's largest piece of installation art, resembled a human eye.

The architectural form of the Marine Parade Community Building has been described as a "dragon", with the roof as a crest and the artwork as the eye of the dragon. The horizontal louvres on the library block were seen as the tail fins of the dragon, an auspicious beast in Chinese culture. Sited adjacent to Housing and Development Board apartment blocks of the Marine Parade Housing Estate, the Marine Parade Community Building could be seen as an attempt to engage the wider community. The activities of the community building were planned to overlap and to coalesce, as a one-stop destination for the entire family. The rich congruence of the multiple programmes for the building is expressed architecturally as a collage of diverse elements. The building was designed by a local architectural firm, William Lim Associates, which adopted a postmodern pluralist approach, expressed through a multiplicity of materials and forms.

The library block was predominantly clad in glass, fitted with horizontal fins, on its frontage with the main road. The alfresco café had a street frontage and was spread into the shared forecourt. The roof of the community building resembled the leaves of a palm tree, and covered the community club's rooftop basketball court. The court's location on the roof level was a departure from the norm, as in other community centres then, the basketball court occupied space on the ground floor.

=== Wall mural ===
The community building was clad in a huge wall mural, a commissioned work of art by Thai architect Surachai Yeamsiri. The mural was Singapore's largest piece of installation art, measuring 63 metres by 12 metres (207 feet by 39 feet), and covered the curved north- and east-facing façade of the community building. Called Texturefulness of Life, the artwork made use of a variety of materials such as glass and wood. The artwork's centrepiece resembles a huge human eye plastered on a wall, made up of tiny mosaic tiles arranged by computer-aided design.

Surachai's abstract piece was the winner in the "Art on Wall" design competition, organised by the Marine Parade Community Club Management Committee in 1998. A panel of international judges picked the winning design from a total of 66 entries submitted by artists, architects, and designers from all over Southeast Asia, including 40 entries from Singapore. Led by local art historian T. K. Sabapathy, the panel felt that the winning entry best reflected the contest's themes of dynamism, interaction, fusion and harmony. The mural was installed on the curved facade of the community building at a cost of S$50,000.
