= Marine Parade =

- Planning Area and HDB Estate

Other transcription(s)
  - Simp. Chinese: 马林百列
  - Trad. Chinese: 馬林百列
  - Pinyin: Mǎlín Bǎiliè
  - Malay: Marine Parade
  - Tamil: மரின் பரேட்
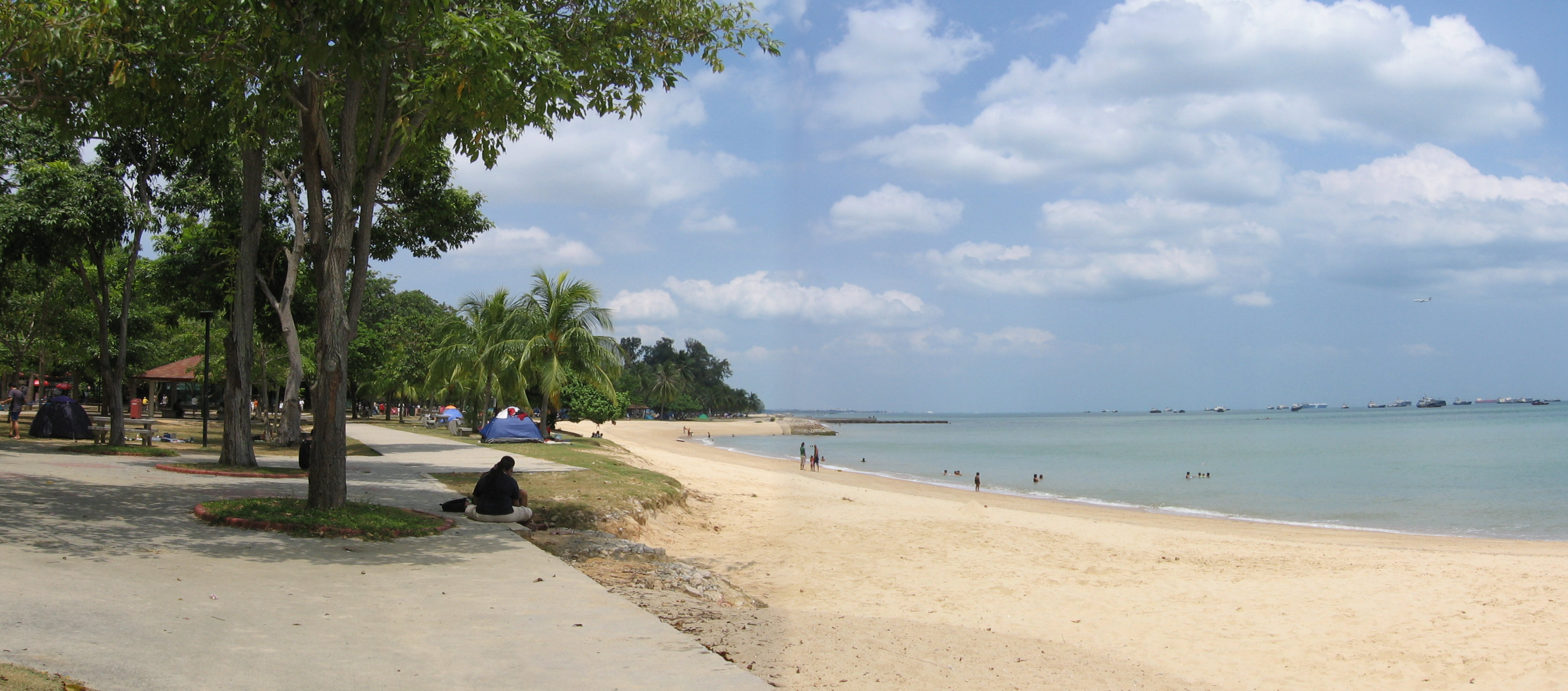
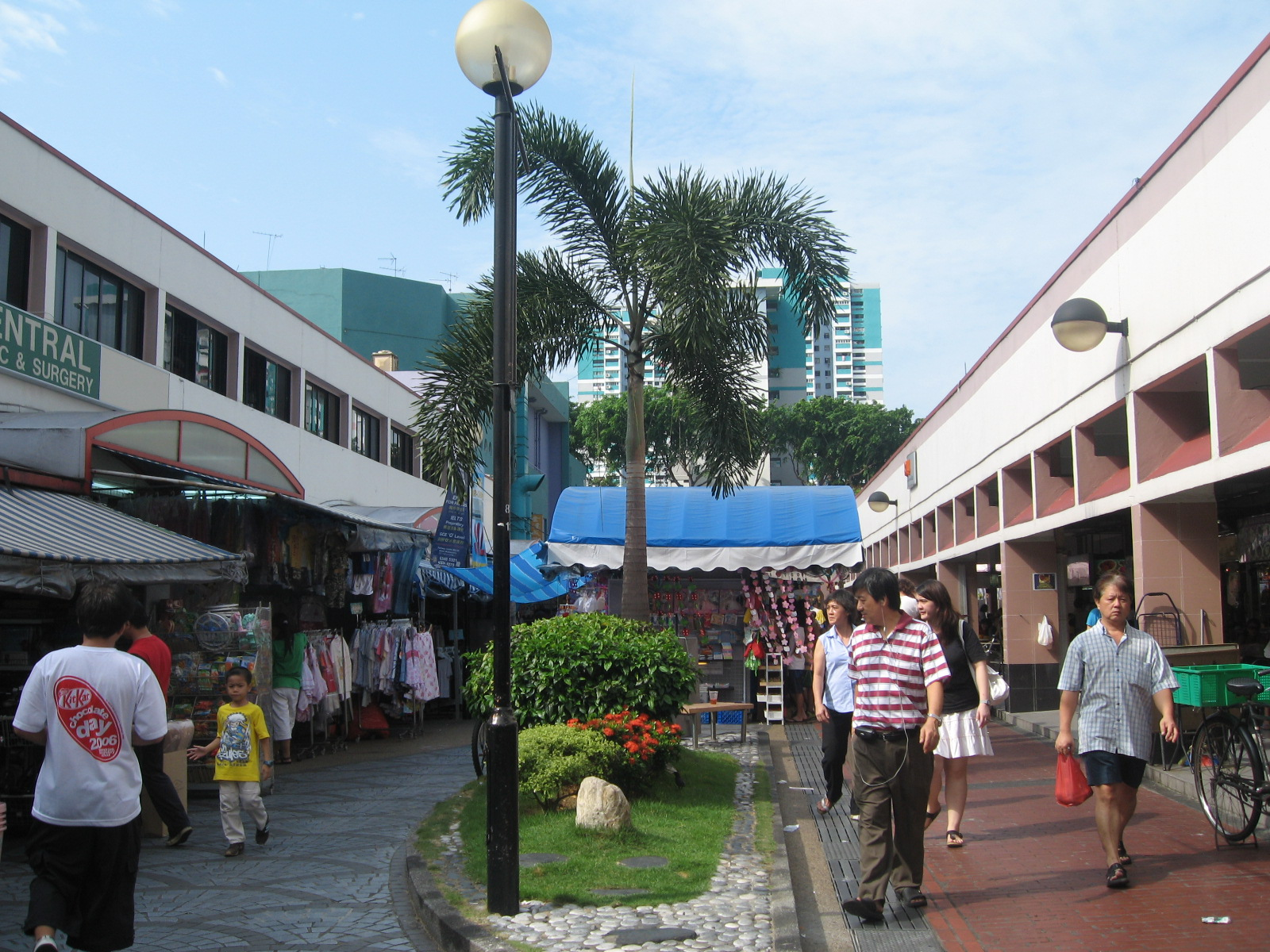
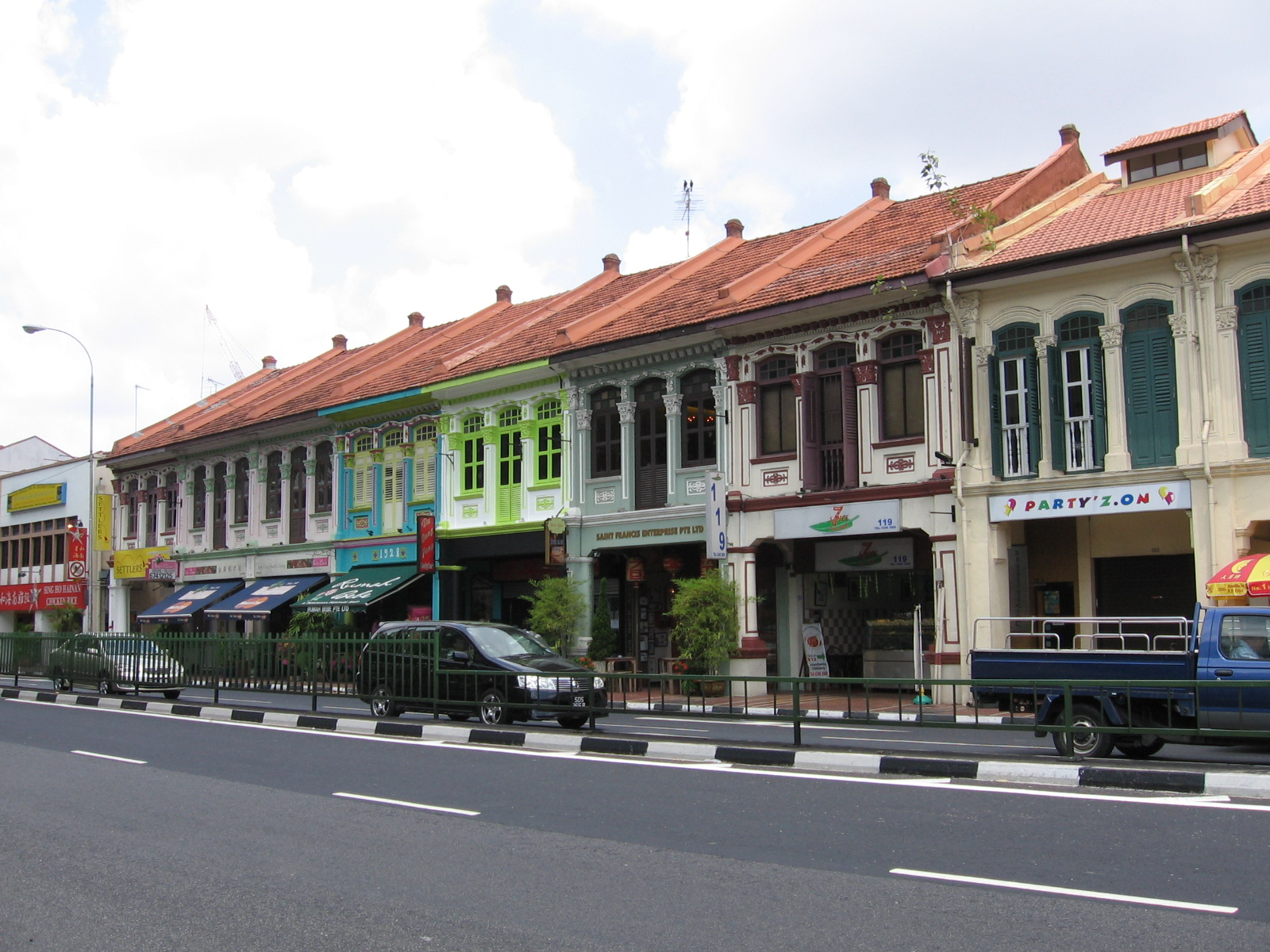
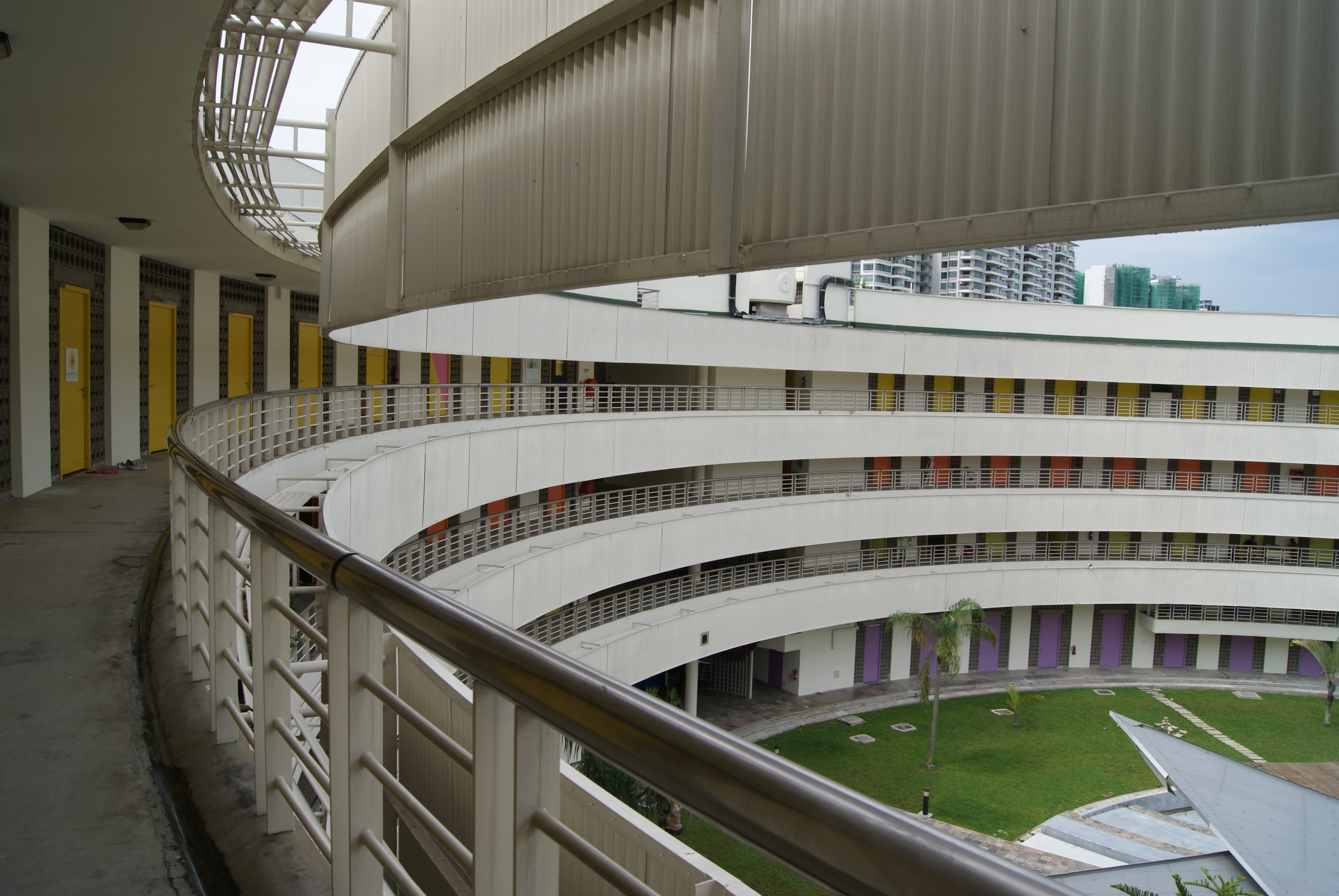
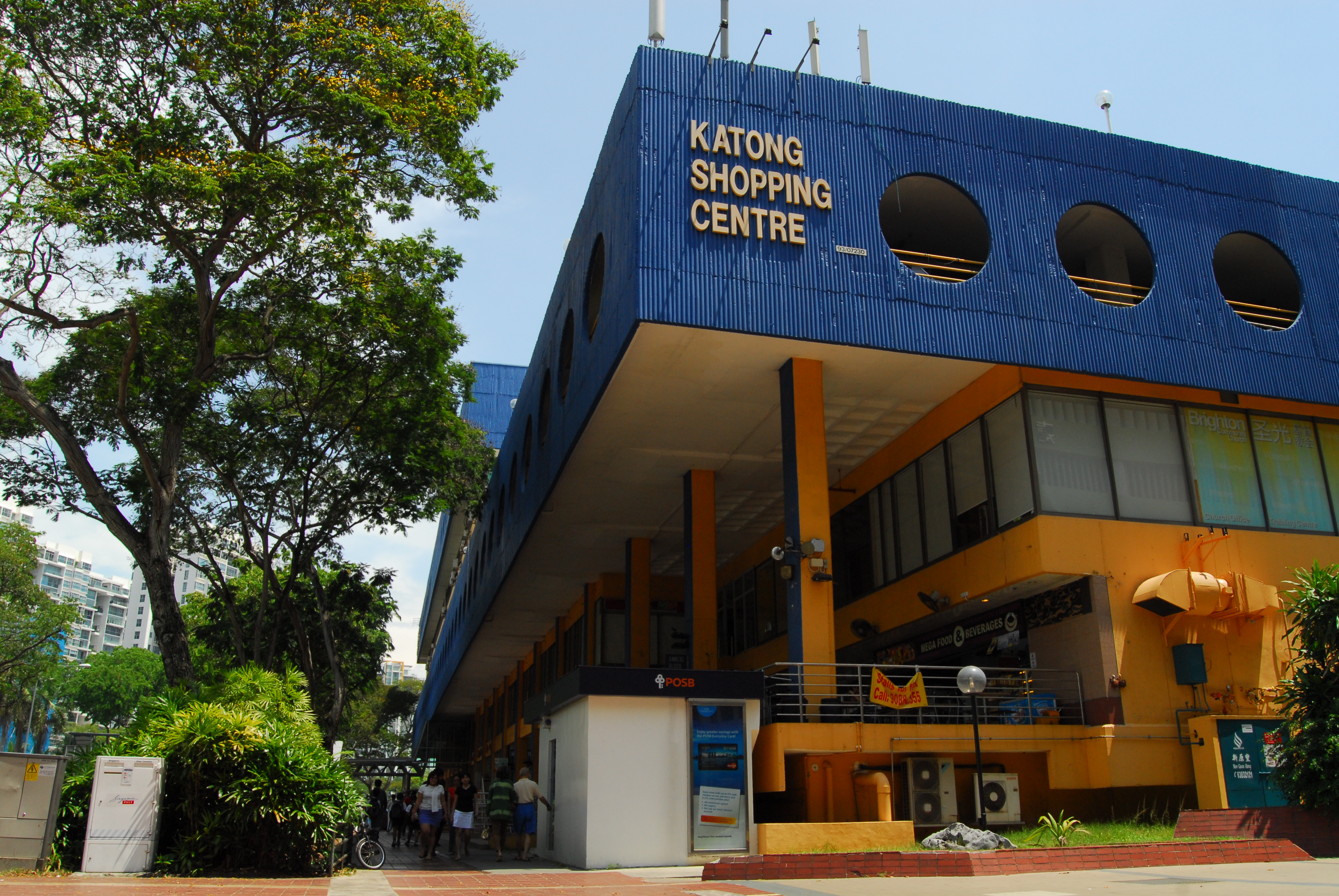
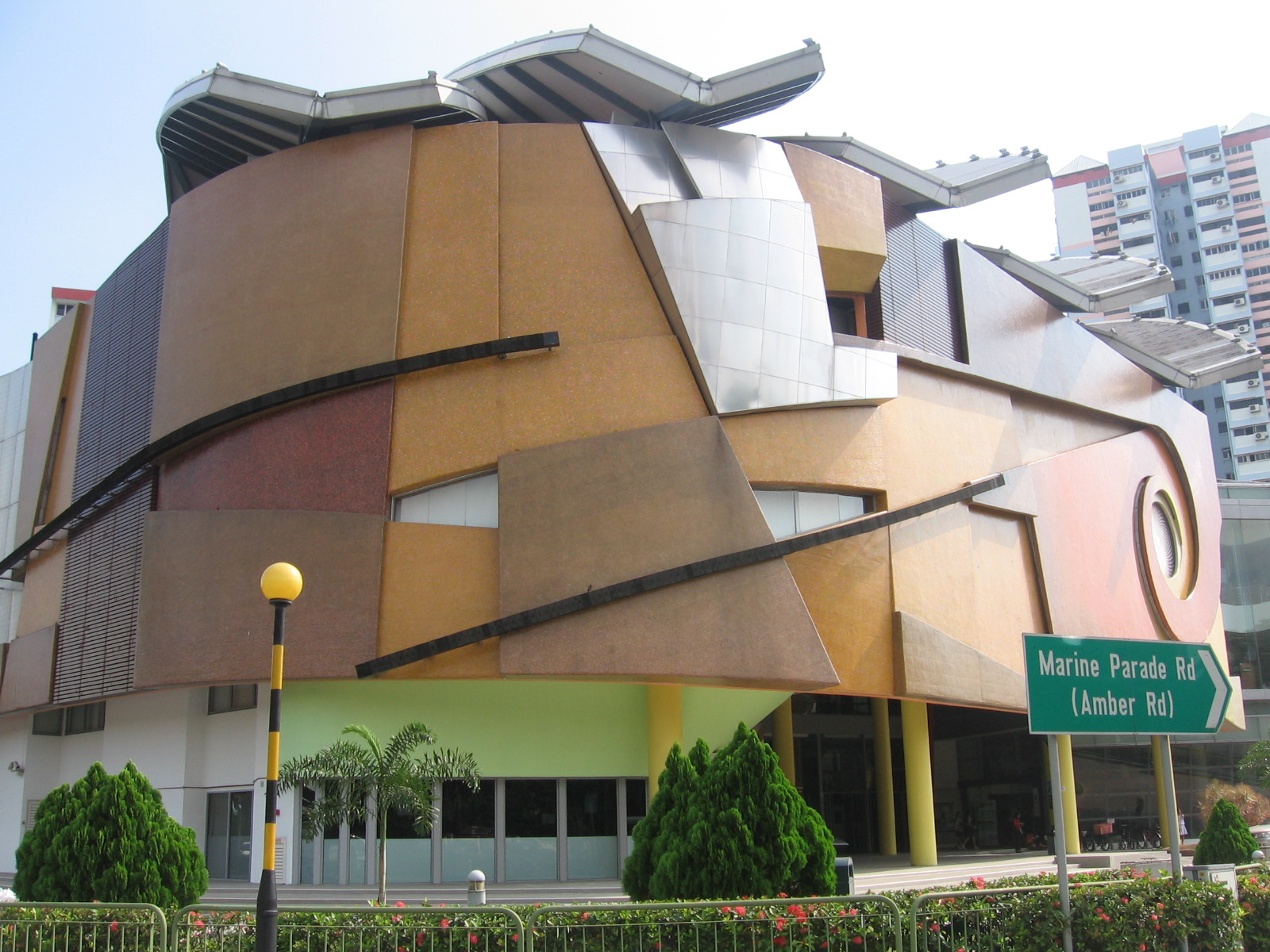
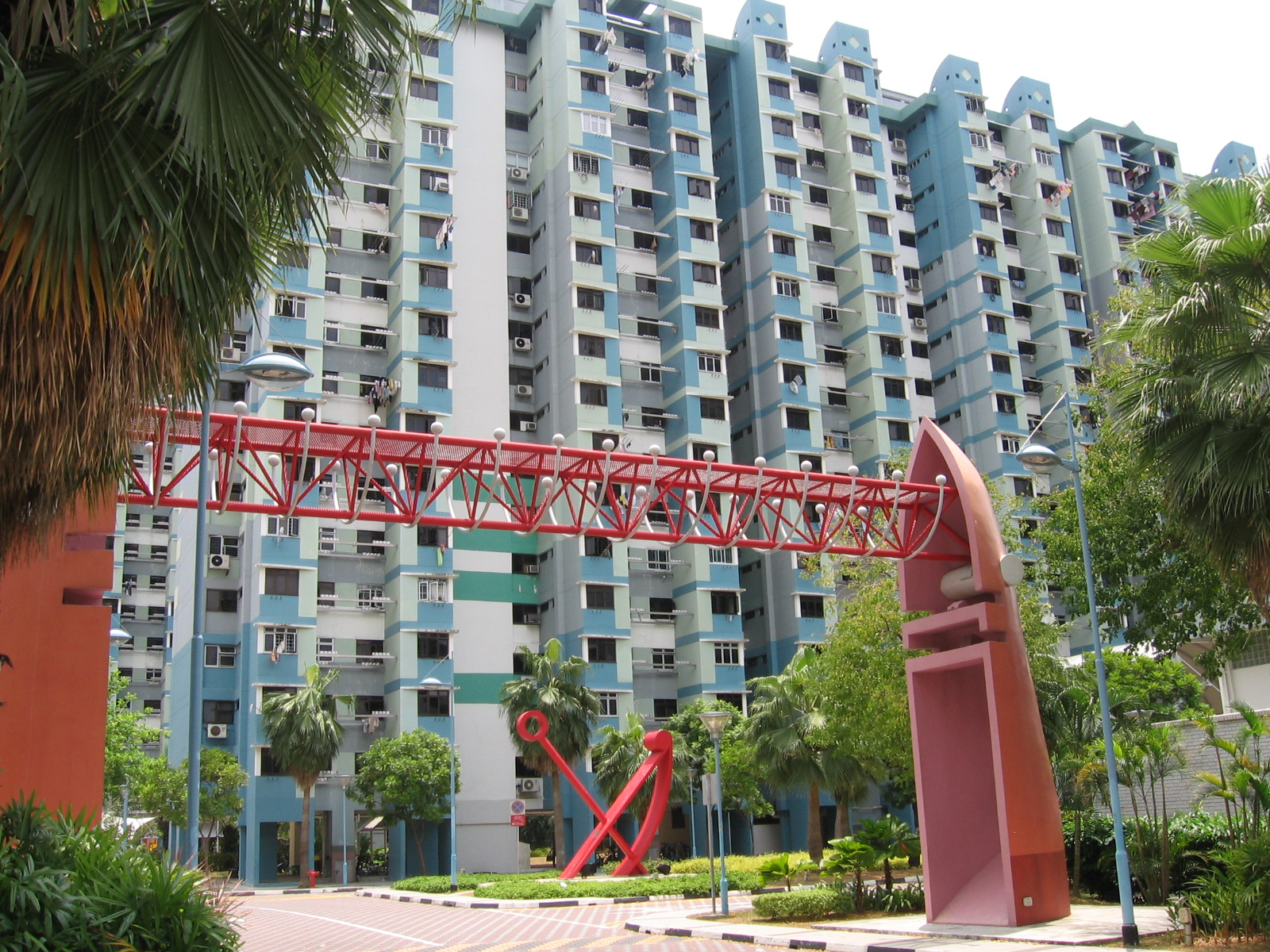
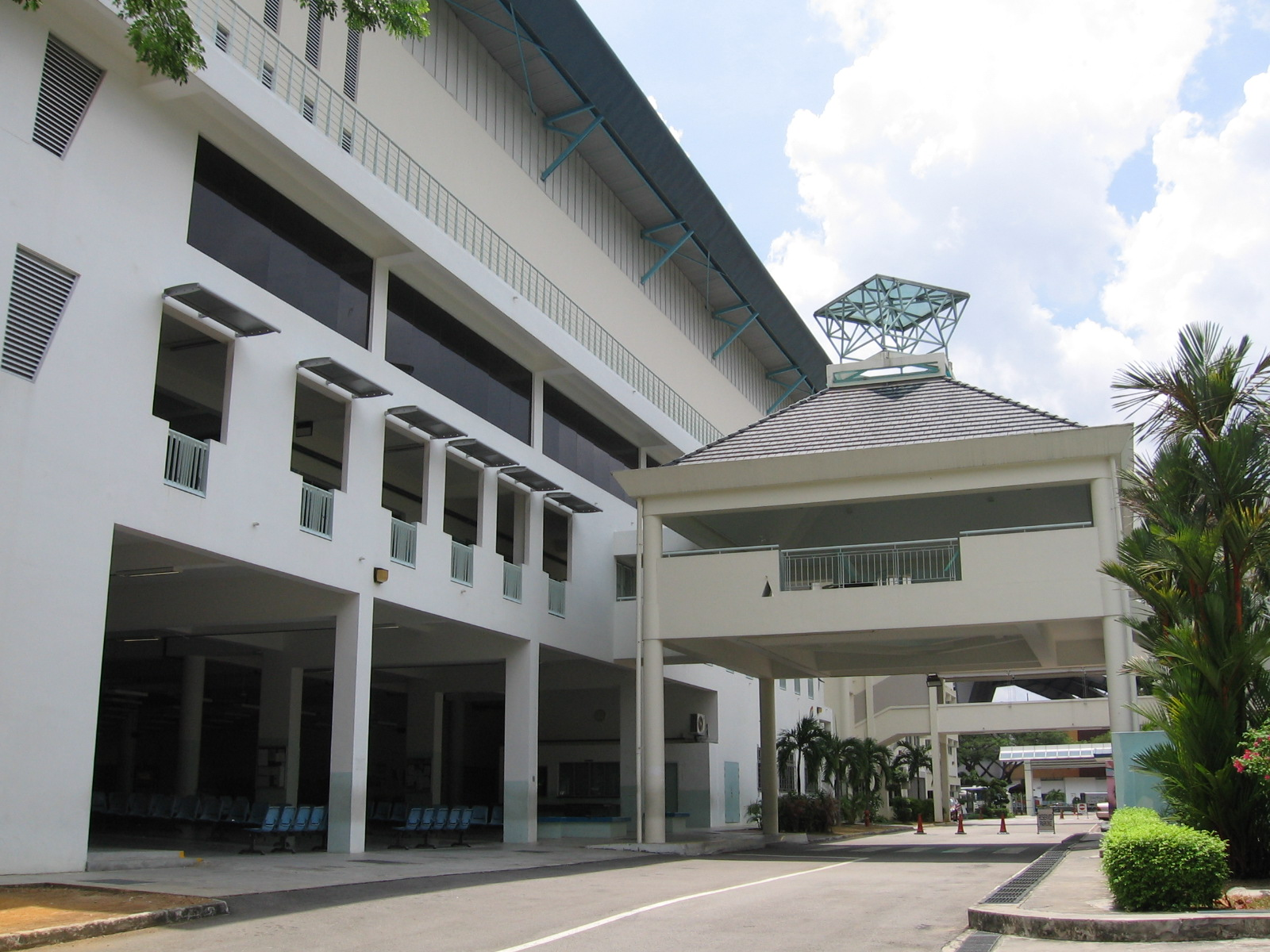
- From top left to right: Panorama of East Coast Park, Marine Parade Promenade, Shophouses in Katong, Goodman Arts Centre, Katong Shopping Centre, Marine Parade Community Building, Marine Crescent Housing Estate, Tao Nan School

- Location in Central Region

- Location of Marine Parade within Singapore
- Coordinates: 1°18′11″N 103°54′28″E
- Country: Singapore
- Region: Central Region
- CDC: South East CDC
- Town councils: Marine Parade Town Council
- Constituencies: Marine Parade-Braddell Heights GRC; Mountbatten SMC

Government
  - Mayor: South East CDC: Dinesh Vasu Dash
  - Members of Parliament: Marine Parade-Braddell Heights GRC: Goh Pei Ming; Mountbatten SMC: Gho Sze Kee

Area
  - Total: 6.13 km^{2} (2.37 sq mi)

Population (2026)
  - Total: 48,490
  - Density: 7,910/km^{2} (20,500/sq mi)
- Demonym: Official: Marine Parade resident
- Postal district: 15
- Dwelling units: 7,862

Marine Parade is a planning area and residential estate located on the eastern fringe of the Central Region of Singapore. Straddling the tip of the southeastern coast of mainland Singapore, Marine Parade serves as a buffer between the Central and East regions of the country. Bordering it are the planning areas of Geylang to the north, Kallang to the northwest, Bedok to the northeast, Marina East to the southwest and the Singapore Straits to the south.

Marine Parade is further divided into five subzones, East Coast, Katong, Marine Parade, Marina East (not to be confused with Marina East, the neighbouring planning area), and Mountbatten.

== Background ==
Marine Parade's early history can be associated with the precinct of Katong. Throughout the early to mid 20th century, the area was a haven for the wealthy Peranakan community of Singapore. Katong witnessed a growth in Straits Chinese culture, developing a distinctive architecture style and even becoming the place of origin for the renowned Katong Laksa dish. Marine Parade, as it is known today, mainly consists of HDB (Housing Development Board) flats along the southernmost points of the estate. These were built in the 1970s after the reclamation of the island's east coast. Today, many private condominiums are also being built in the area.

== Administration ==
Marine Parade has five subzones, which are divisions of planning areas. These five are East Coast, Katong, Marine Parade, Marina East, and Mountbatten. As of June 2024, Marine Parade is the most populous subzone at 27,140 residents whilst Marina East and East Coast are the least populous with 0 residents.

== Infrastructure ==
The main public housing estate comprises 58 blocks of HDB flats. The public estate is bisected by the arterial Still Road South that provides access to the major highway, East Coast Parkway, leading to the city area and to Singapore Changi Airport.

=== Transportation ===
Marine Parade is served by four Mass Rapid Transit (MRT) stations on the Thomson–East Coast line. Two of them, Marine Parade and Tanjong Katong, are directly in the planning area, whilst the other two, Marine Terrace and Katong Park, are at its borders with other planning areas.

=== Community Building ===
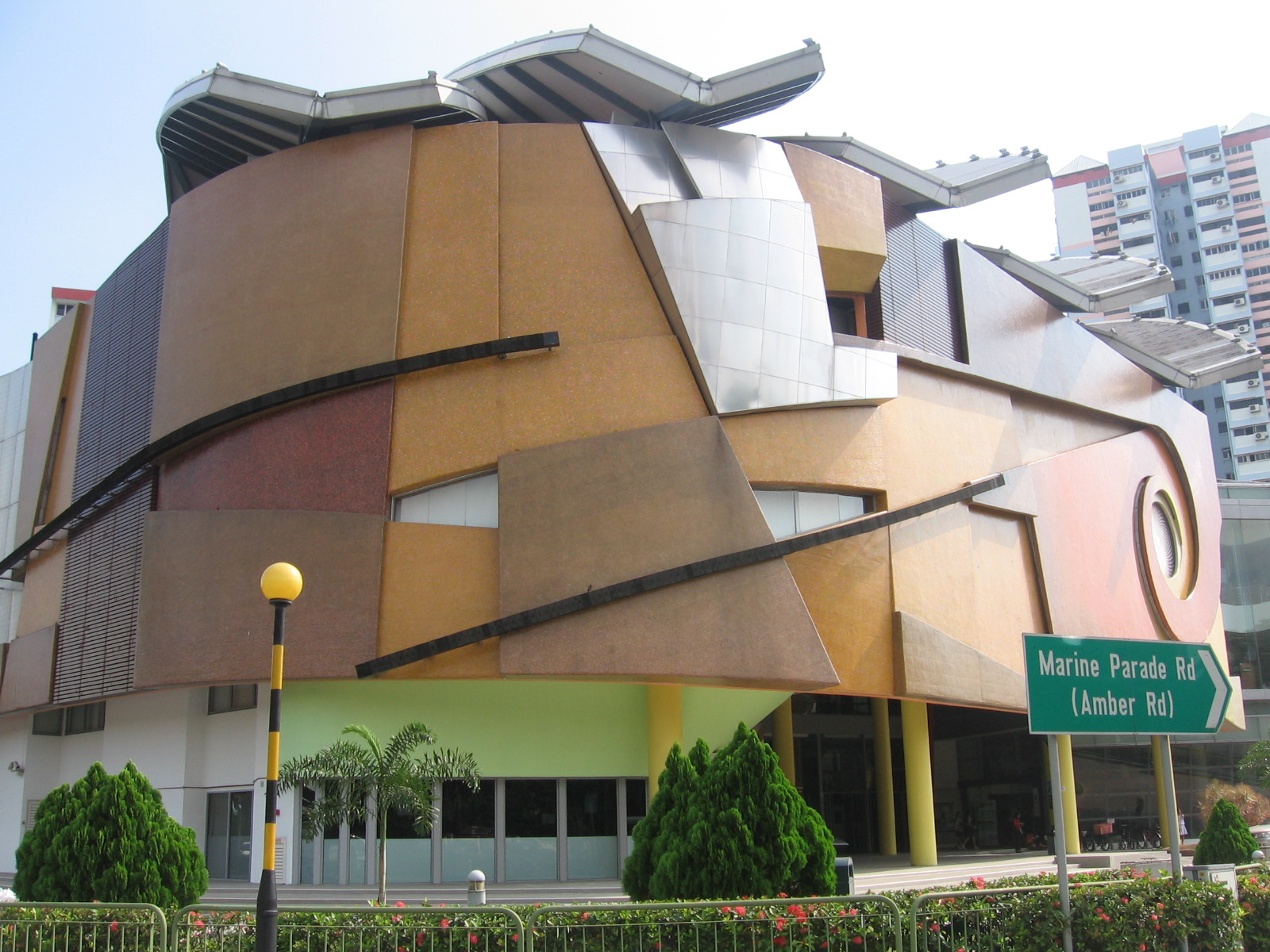
Marine Parade Community Building

The Marine Parade Community Building was completed in 2000. It houses the Marine Parade Community Club and the Marine Parade Public Library. Other facilities within the three-storey complex include a 263-seater theatrette, a glass-walled gymnasium, a covered basketball court on the rooftop, an air-conditioned and a sports hall. The building has since been demolished, and is receiving a major upgrade.

=== Town centre ===
Marine Parade, like other towns in Singapore, is served by a town centre. Dubbed Marine Parade Promenade, the centre itself consists of several neighbourhood shops, Parkway Centre and commercial complex namely Parkway Parade with integrates a shopping mall and office tower combined, and a new mall, iMall, located at the junction of Marine Parade Central.

== Education ==
As Marine Parade is primarily either recreational or residential, it is also a host to a variety of schools.

- Primary Schools
  - CHIJ (Katong) Primary
  - Ngee Ann Primary School
  - Tao Nan School
  - Haig Girls' School
  - Tanjong Katong Primary School
- Secondary Schools
  - CHIJ Katong Convent
  - St. Patrick's School
  - Chung Cheng High School (Main)
  - Tanjong Katong Secondary School
  - Tanjong Katong Girls' School
- Junior Colleges
  - Victoria Junior College

== Politics ==
Marine Parade is a component division of the Marine Parade-Braddell Heights Group Representation Constituency and Mountbatten Single Member Constituency as of the 2025 election. The second and former Prime Minister of Singapore Goh Chok Tong represented Marine Parade since its formation in 1976 until his retirement in 2020. Currently, Marine Parade is represented by two MPs, with Gho Sze Kee representing the westernmost areas under Mountbatten SMC, and Goh Pei Ming for the majority of Marine Parade; his predecessor, Minister Tan See Leng, left there to contest Chua Chu Kang GRC in 2025.

== Notable places ==
- Sea Breeze Lodge, historical bungalow
