= Marine Parade Public Library =

Public library in Singapore

Coordinates: 1°18′18.2″N 103°54′34.2″E

- Location: 278 Marine Parade Road, #01-02, Marine Parade Community Building, Singapore 449282, Singapore
- Type: Public library
- Established: 10 November 1978; 47 years ago (Old); 2026; 0 years ago (New)
- Closed: 9 May 2022; 4 years ago (Old)
- Branch of: National Library Board

Collection
- Size: 214,000

Access and use
- Population served: 160,000

Other information
- Website: Official website

Marine Parade Public Library is a public library in Marine Parade, Singapore. It is co-located with Marine Parade Community Club in the Marine Parade Community Building. It is the first public library owned by the National Library Board to be located inside a community building. Since May 2022, the library has been closed for revamp work. Originally scheduled to be reopened in 2025, it was delayed to Q1 2026, in tandem with the reopening of the Marine Parade Community Building which the library is housed in.

== History ==
The library was originally called Marine Parade Branch Library. It was officially opened on 10 November 1978 by Mr Goh Chok Tong, Senior Minister of State (Finance) and Member of Parliament for Marine Parade Single Member Constituency and was opened to the public three days later on 13 November 1978. The Marine Parade Community Library was originally located at the town centre of Marine Parade Housing Estate at 6 Marine Parade Central, Singapore 449411, before it shifted to its new premises at the community building. The library is Singapore's second-oldest public library and the only one built on reclaimed land. The Marine Parade Branch Library was renamed as Marine Parade Community Library when the National Library Board became a statutory board in September 1995. It started moving in stages to the community building in April 2000, and was officially opened by Goh Chok Tong on 28 May that year. The Marine Parade Community Library is the first public library in Singapore to be housed together with a community club and an arts group. The library's old premises was renovated for an NTUC FairPrice supermarket. It was renamed as Marine Parade Public Library in 2008.

The library is spread over four floors of the Marine Parade Community Building, with a floor area of 3,534 square metres (38,039 square feet). As one of the first neighbourhood libraries, the library's entire second floor is its children's book section, featuring murals, trivia and multimedia tools. The library has more than 150,000 books and 2,500 videos available for loan. There is a café on the ground floor, and the library is fitted with numerous couches and benches for the public's use. Other facilities include multimedia stations, do-it-yourself service stations, and music posts equipped with headphones.

== See also ==
- National Library Board
- List of libraries in Singapore
