= Tanglin Shopping Centre =

Shopping mall in Tanglin, Singapore

Coordinates: 1.30554°N 103.8226139°E

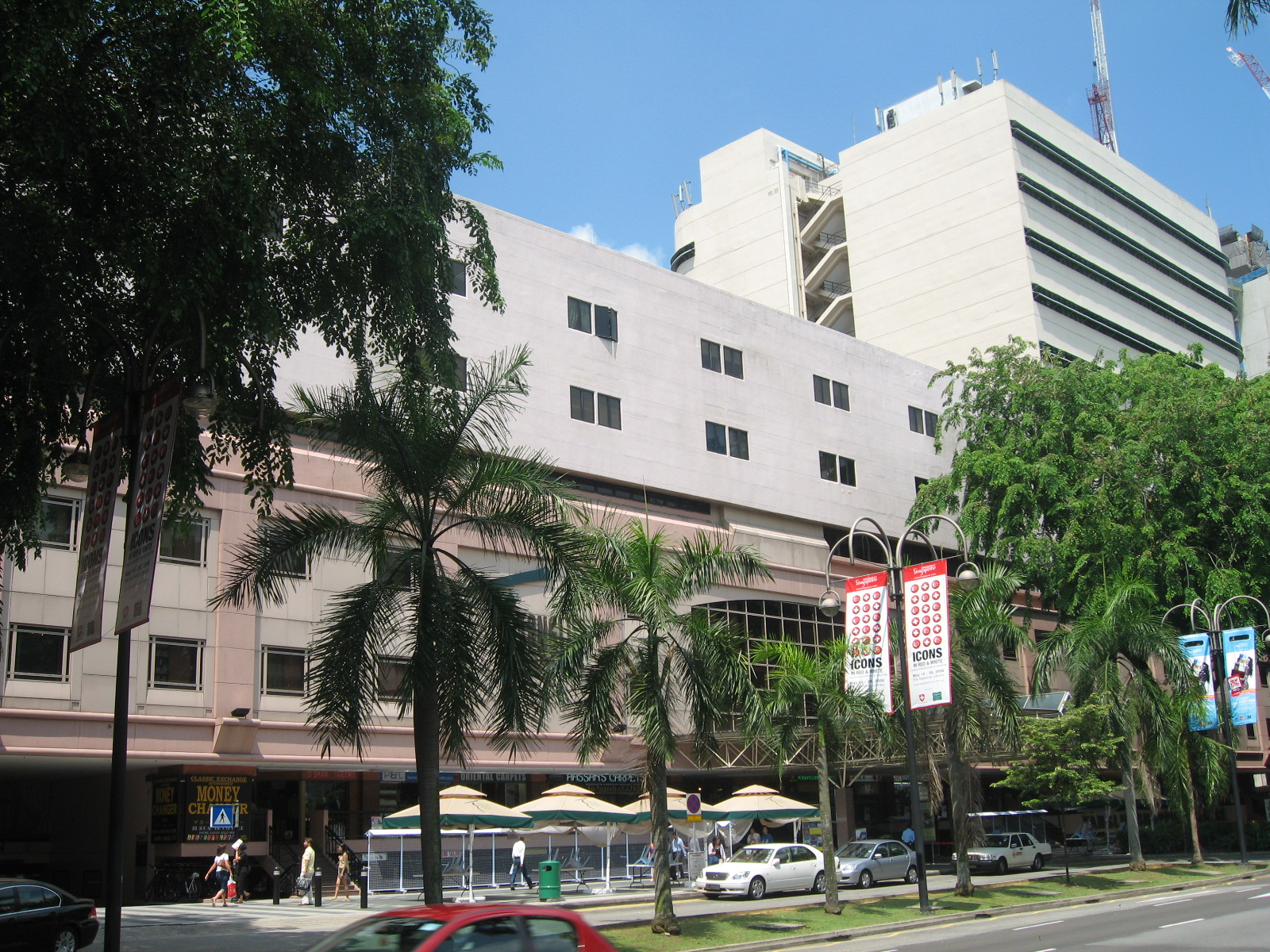
The building in 2006

Tanglin Shopping Centre was a shopping centre on Tanglin Road in Tanglin, Singapore. Completed in 1972, the mall was the "first modern shopping mall to be established in the area and the second oldest in Singapore after People's Park Complex (built in 1967) in Chinatown."

City Developments Limited, the mall's previous owners, made several failed collective sale attempts for the mall. The fourth attempt to sell the mall was successful, with Singaporean-based developer Pacific Eagle Real Estate purchasing the building for $868 million in February 2022.

The building completed its demolition as of 29 December 2024.

Construction of the new complex is on going, with demolition works of the basement in progress as of April 2026.

== History ==
The construction of the mall, which cost $7.5 million, began in December 1969. The mall, which would feature offices, retail shops, restaurants and a private medical facility known as the Singapore Medical Centre, was to cater towards both locals and tourists. It would also feature a 150-lot carpark. It was designed by prominent architect William S. W. Lim, who also designed both the People's Park Complex and the Golden Mile Complex, and was developed by S.K. Chee Co. By late 1971, the mall had nearly been completed, with most units having already been sold or leased. Tenants began moving in just prior to the Christmas and holiday season. It was completed in January 1972, being completely operational from 21 January onwards. Many of the shops within the building had already opened their doors by the end of the month.

In March 1978, the government approved plans for a $12 million extension of the mall. "Phase Two" of the shopping centre was completed by July 1980 and introduced an additional 14,864 sqm of shops and offices. In addition to new medical units and offices, the extension also featured the addition of an "antique centre", with at most ten of the units on the lower ground floor being sold or leased to antique dealers. According to Roots, which is published by the National Heritage Board, following the extension, the mall "became a popular haunt for the rich and famous to acquire antiques and artworks." Musicians Elton John and Paul Simon, as well as United States Secretary of State Madeleine Albright visited the mall after its revamp. In 1980, the Singapore National Employers Federation occupied an entire floor of the mall. The United Overseas Bank moved into the mall from its former premises at the Singapore Hilton Hotel in February of the following year.

City Developments Limited, the mall's owners, made several failed collective sale attempts for the mall. The fourth attempt to sell the mall was successful, with Singaporean-based developer Pacific Eagle Real Estate purchasing the building for $868 million.

== Demolition ==
As of 22 May 2024, the building underwent demolition to make way for a mixed-used development.

By 2025, the basement level was left intact to support the existing foundation for piling and drainage works .

In 2026, demolition of the basement carpark is ongoing to be completed by the second quarter of 2026.

== References, news ==
13. Tanglin Shopping Centre’s 52-Year Legacy at Orchard Road. Posted on January 29, 2025 by Remember Singapore. Retrieved 6 March 2025.
