= Tan Yoong =

Singaporean fashion designer

Tan Yoong (Chinese: 陈永; 1950 — January 2017) was a Singaporean fashion designer.

== Early life and education ==
Yoong was born as the youngest of six children. He began attending the Nanyang Academy of Fine Arts in 1967.

== Career ==
After leaving the academy, Tan began working as an artist for an advertising firm. He later worked for the advertising agency Batey Ads. In 1975, he participated in his first fashion design competition, the Japan's Kanebo Grand Award, and became the first non-Japanese to win the haute couture segment of the competition. He won a bronze medal in the same segment of the competition in 1977. In 1978, he won the Her World Young Designers Contest.

He left Batey Ads in 1979 and established two labels, Tze and Zhen, with BP De Silva Group. The latter closed in 1981, and Tan bought over Tze in 1983. By 1989, the most expensive dress he had designed cost $12,000. He converted his flagship boutique in Lucky Plaza to a bridal salon in 1996.

He was one of the "Magnetic Seven", a group of pioneering fashion designers in Singapore. His creations have been worn by the daughter-in-law of former president of Singapore Ong Teng Cheong and Penny Chang, the wife of Malaysian politician Tan Koon Swan.

== Death ==
Tan died in January 2017 after suffering a head injury during a fall.
