= Club Street =

Street in Chinatown, Singapore

Coordinates: 1.28220°N 103.84638°E

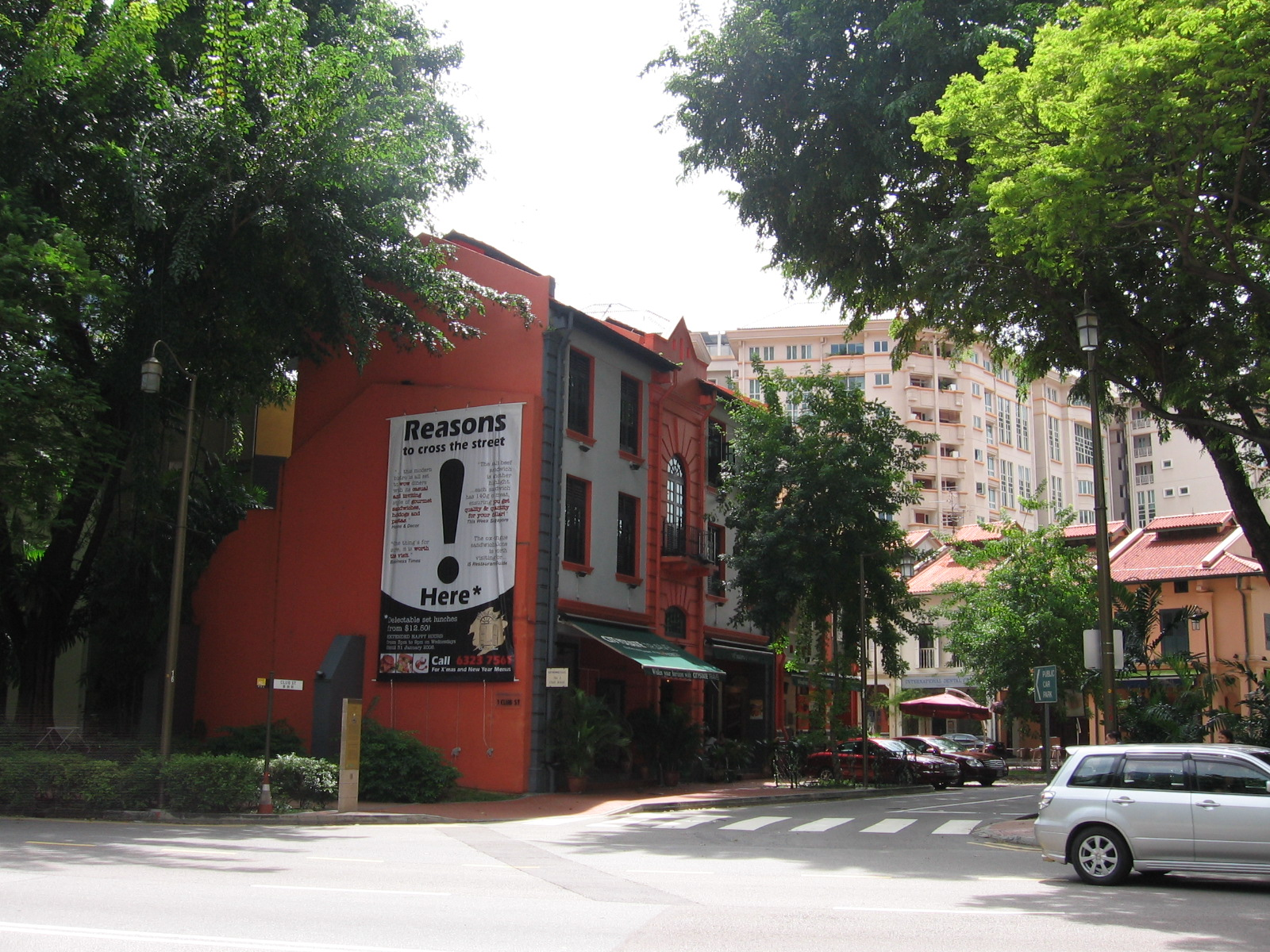
Club Street, Chinatown, Singapore.

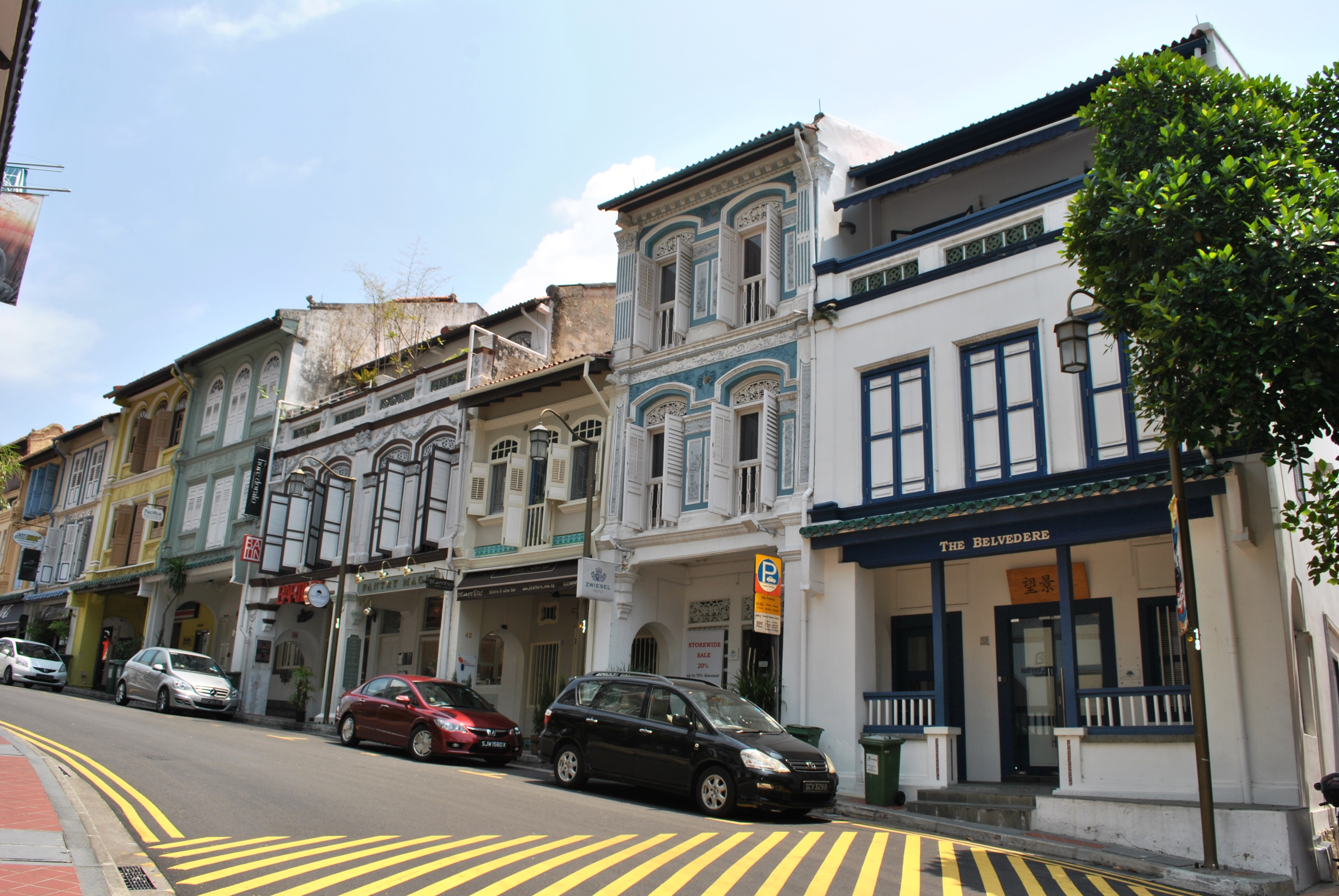
Club Street, shophouses

Club Street (simplified Chinese: 客纳街; traditional Chinese: 客納街) is a street located in Chinatown within the Outram Planning Area in Singapore. Club Street links Cross Street with Ann Siang Hill, which leads to South Bridge Road.

The street is lined with conserved shops that are occupied by restaurants, bars and several galleries.

== Etymology and history ==
The street was named Club Street due to its abundance of Chinese clubs in early Singapore history. Clubs such as the Chinese Weekly Entertainment Kee Lam Club, a Straits-Chinese club formed in 1891, Chui Lan Teng Club, mainly for Chinese businessman to socialise and the Ee Hoe Hean Club, an exclusive prestigious Chinese club in the 1920s are located at the street which leads to competitive claims which club lead to the naming of the street.

As there is a big gateway at the entrance of Club street from Upper Cross Street, local Chinese referred to this street as tua man lai, meaning inside the big gate. Hokkiens also had another local name for it, chui lan teng, possibly referring to the Chui Lan Teng Club which existed there.
