= State Courts of Singapore =

Singaporean subordinate court

State Courts, Singapore
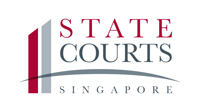
- Interactive map of State Courts, Singapore
- 1.2863°N 103.8410°E
- Jurisdiction: Singapore
- Location: State Courts Building, No 1 Havelock Square, Singapore 059724
- Coordinates: 1.2863°N 103.8410°E
- Composition method: District judges and magistrates are appointed by the president upon the recommendation of the chief justice
- Appeals to: Supreme Court of Singapore
- Website: https://www.judiciary.gov.sg

Presiding Judge
- Currently: Vincent Hoong Seng Lei
- Since: 1 April 2020

Deputy Presiding Judge
- Currently: Jennifer Marie

The State Courts of Singapore (formerly the Subordinate Courts) is one of the three categories of courts in Singapore, the other categories being the Supreme Court and Family Justice Courts. The State Courts comprise the District and Magistrate Courts—both of which oversee civil and criminal matters—as well as specialised courts such as the coroner's courts and the Small Claims Tribunals.

The State Courts comprise district and magistrate courts and hear both civil and criminal cases that do not fall under the jurisdiction of the Supreme Court. Over 90% of all judicial cases in Singapore are heard in the State Courts. Its annual volume averages about 350,000 cases.

The district judges, magistrates, and registrars of the State Courts are all judicial service officers and serve under the supervision and control of Singapore's Judicial Service Commission. District judges and magistrates are appointed by the president upon the recommendation of the chief justice.

== Main operational units ==
There are three main divisions in the State Courts. They are the Justice Division, Judicial Administration Division, and the Presiding Judge’s Office. These divisions comprise the Criminal Courts cluster; the Civil Courts cluster; the Community Courts and Tribunals cluster; the Court Dispute Resolution cluster; the Office of the Registrar; the Corporate Services cluster; the Strategic Planning and Technology cluster; the Legal Directorate; the Centre for Learning; and the Internal Audit.

The Presiding Judge of the State Courts, a position held by a Supreme Court Judge or Judicial Commissioner, has overall responsibility for the administration of the State Courts. The Presiding Judge leads a team of judicial officers who adjudicate on cases brought before the State Courts. He is assisted administratively by the Deputy Presiding Judge and Registrar.

In October 2014, the Family Justice Courts were formed, and therefore family and youth-related cases no longer fall under the purview of the State Courts.

== Senior judicial officers ==
The senior judicial officers of the State Courts are:

- Vincent Hoong Seng Lei, Presiding Judge of the State Courts; 2020 -
- Deputy Presiding Judge of the State Courts Jennifer Marie;
- Registrar Christopher Tan;
- Principal District Judge (Criminal Courts) Toh Han Li;
- Principal District Judge (Community Courts and Tribunals and Court Dispute Resolution) Thian Yee Sze;
- Principal District Judge (Criminal Courts) Victor Yeo;
- Principal District Judge (Strategic Planning and Technology) Toh Yung Cheong;
- Principal District Judge (Civil Courts) Seah Chi-Ling; and
- Acting Principal District Judge (Corporate Services) Jill Tan

Prior senior judicial officers

- Justice See Kee Oon, Presiding Judge of the State Courts; - 2020

== The State Courts Building ==
The State Courts (then known as the Subordinate Courts) officially began operating at 1 Havelock Square on 15 September 1975. The construction of the State Courts Building marked the centralisation of the delivery of justice from various courthouses to one courthouse at 1 Havelock Square. Prior to 1975, the Criminal District and Magistrates’ Courts were located in South Bridge Road, between North Canal Road and Upper Pickering Street; the Traffic Courts were housed in the former Sepoy Lines Police Station in Outram; while the Civil District Courts operated out of the old Parliament Building and the Supreme Court Building at St. Andrew’s Road.

In designing the Building, much thought was put into the movement and circulation of the judicial officers, the court administrators, persons in custody and court users, with these groups having segregated routes in certain areas. The movement and circulation requirements became the foundation of the Building’s iconic design that involved the geometric distribution of the courtrooms in an octagonal formation with a central atrium. Its facilities also incorporated many innovative features that were ahead of its time. The Building was one of the first “fireproof” government buildings in Singapore with its sprinkler system that was put in place as part of the anti-fire measures to protect the wooden wall panels in the courtrooms. It also features an environmentally-sensitive design, through the use of natural lighting to illuminate the atrium.

When first completed in 1975, the Building housed 26 courtrooms. To cope with an increasing caseload, more courtrooms were added over the years. Today, there are 40 courtrooms and 28 hearing chambers. The services provided by the State Courts have also increased over the past four decades to better serve the community. The building achieved conservation status on 10 July 2013.

The State Courts building is described to be an example of Modern Brutalist architecture, with its angular shapes and fortress-like appearance.

In 2020, the State Courts moved to a new building, which still retaining its address of 1 Havelock Square. The new building, known as State Courts Towers, is located next to its former premises and occupies a space that used to be an open-air carpark.

== The new State Courts Towers ==
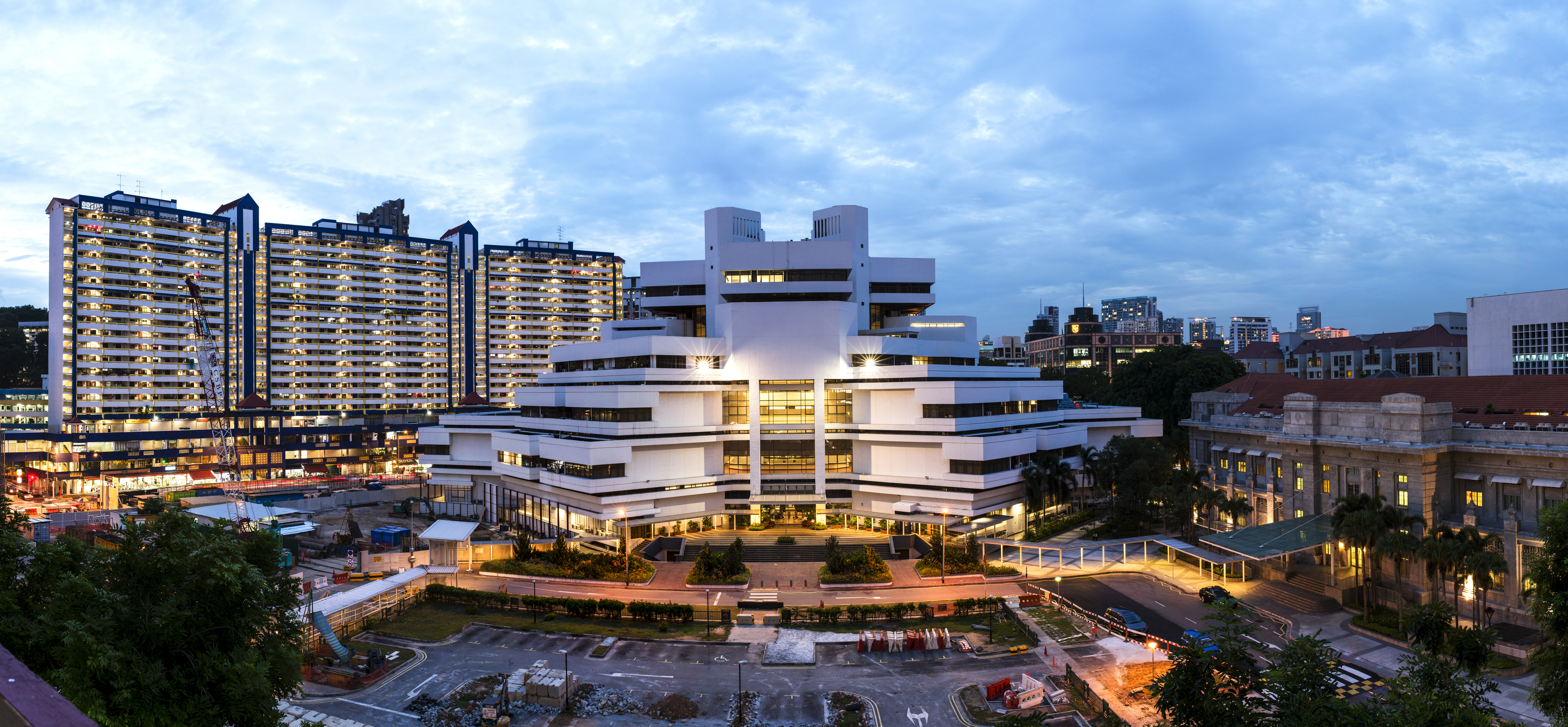
Panorama of the old complex before works began in 2014

=== Design ===
As stated in a media release published by the State Courts, the 178-metre tall State Courts Towers are fitted with 53 courtrooms and 54 hearing chambers. The Court Tower include offices and other court supporting functions and offices.

The design of the new State Courts Towers is derived from an open design competition held in September 2011. The project comprises a development of a new tower and retrofitting the existing State Courts Building. Serie Architects and Multiply Architects & Engineers LLP was awarded the assignment in June 2012, and worked with CPG Corporation to implement the submitted design. It was shortlisted from the 19 proposals submitted.

=== Groundbreaking and construction ===
The State Courts Towers' groundbreaking ceremony took place in May 2014. Piling works and service diversions began in June that same year.

In 2016, Samsung C&T Corporation received the contract for constructing the new building. Construction works were planned for the second quarter of 2016, with construction taking 36 months. The State Courts commenced full operations in the State Courts Towers on 16 December 2019.

== Awards and achievements ==
=== 2012 United Nations Public Service Award ===
The establishment of the Help centre - which stands for Helping to Empower Litigants- in-Person - clinched the State Courts the second prize in the category of 'Improving the Delivery of Public Services' for Asia and the Pacific region.

=== 2011 Singapore Quality Award with Special Commendation ===
The State Courts of Singapore won the coveted Singapore Quality Award 2011 with Special Commendation (SQA-SC), an award which represents the pinnacle of business excellence in Singapore.

2011 – Attained Singapore Quality Award with Special Commendation (SQA-SC)

2006 – Attained Singapore Quality Award (SQA)

2001 – Attained Singapore Quality Class (SQC)

== Controversy ==
In July 2007, a man was wrongfully caned an extra three strokes of the cane in prison due to an administrative error of a court officer and an oversight of a judicial officer. Subsequently, the man sought an undisclosed sum of compensation from the Attorney-General's Chambers.

In September 2020, a man was wrongfully jailed an extra two days due to an administrative error of a court officer for not updating the fine that was already paid for in its computer information system. Subsequently, the man engaged a defence lawyer to seek compensation from the Attorney-General's Chambers.

== Gallery ==
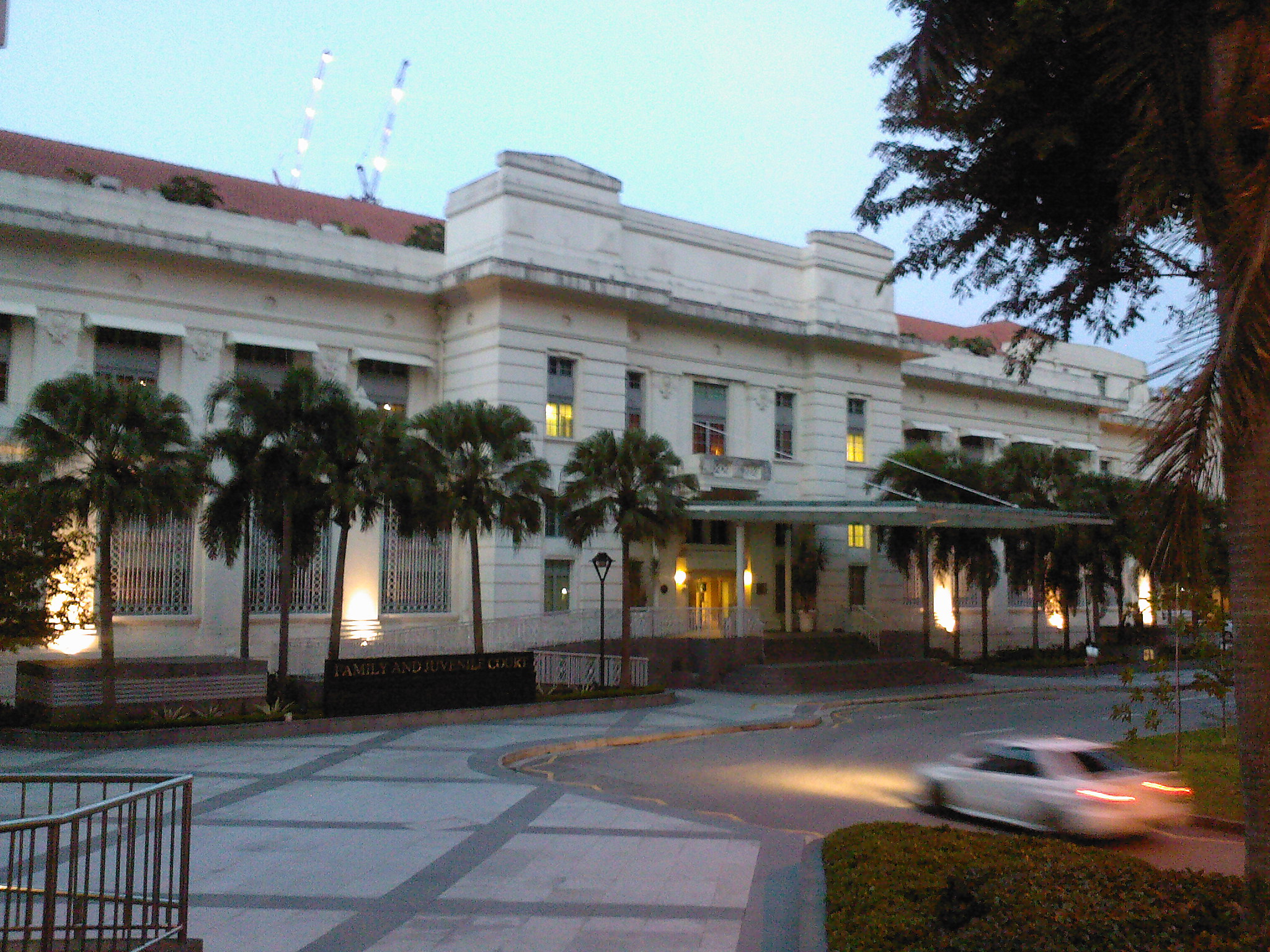
Family Court

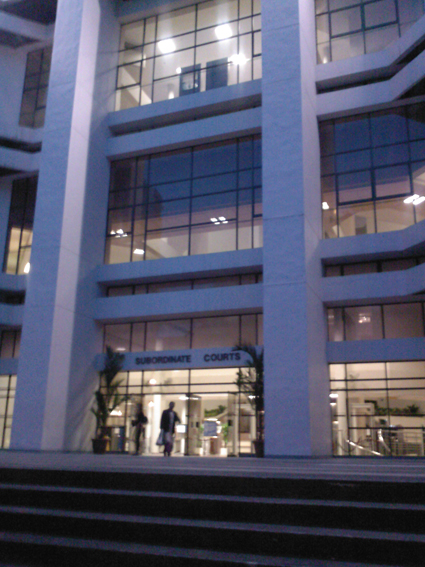
Entrance to the State Courts

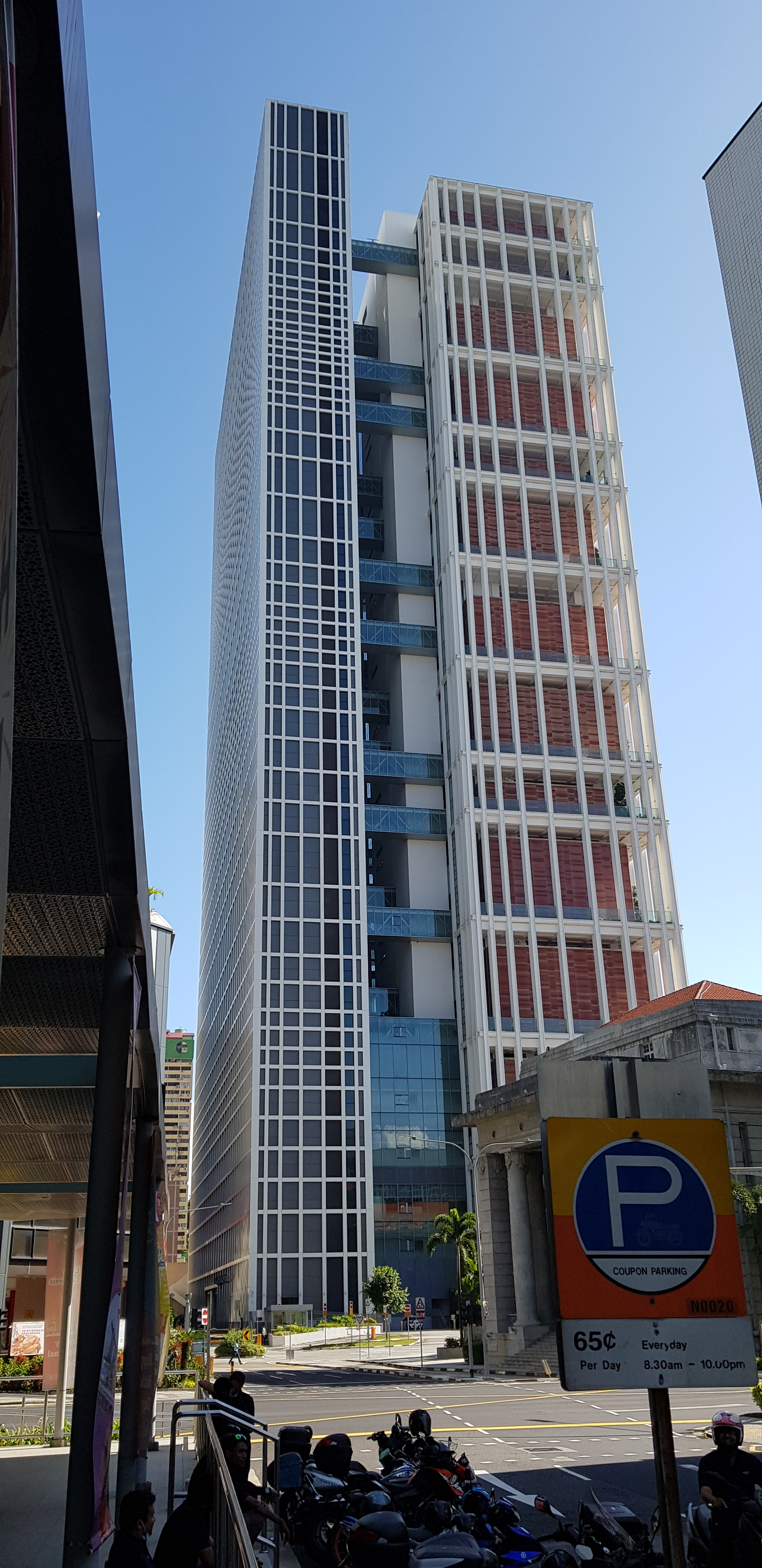
The current State Courts Tower
