= Cross Street =

Street in Singapore

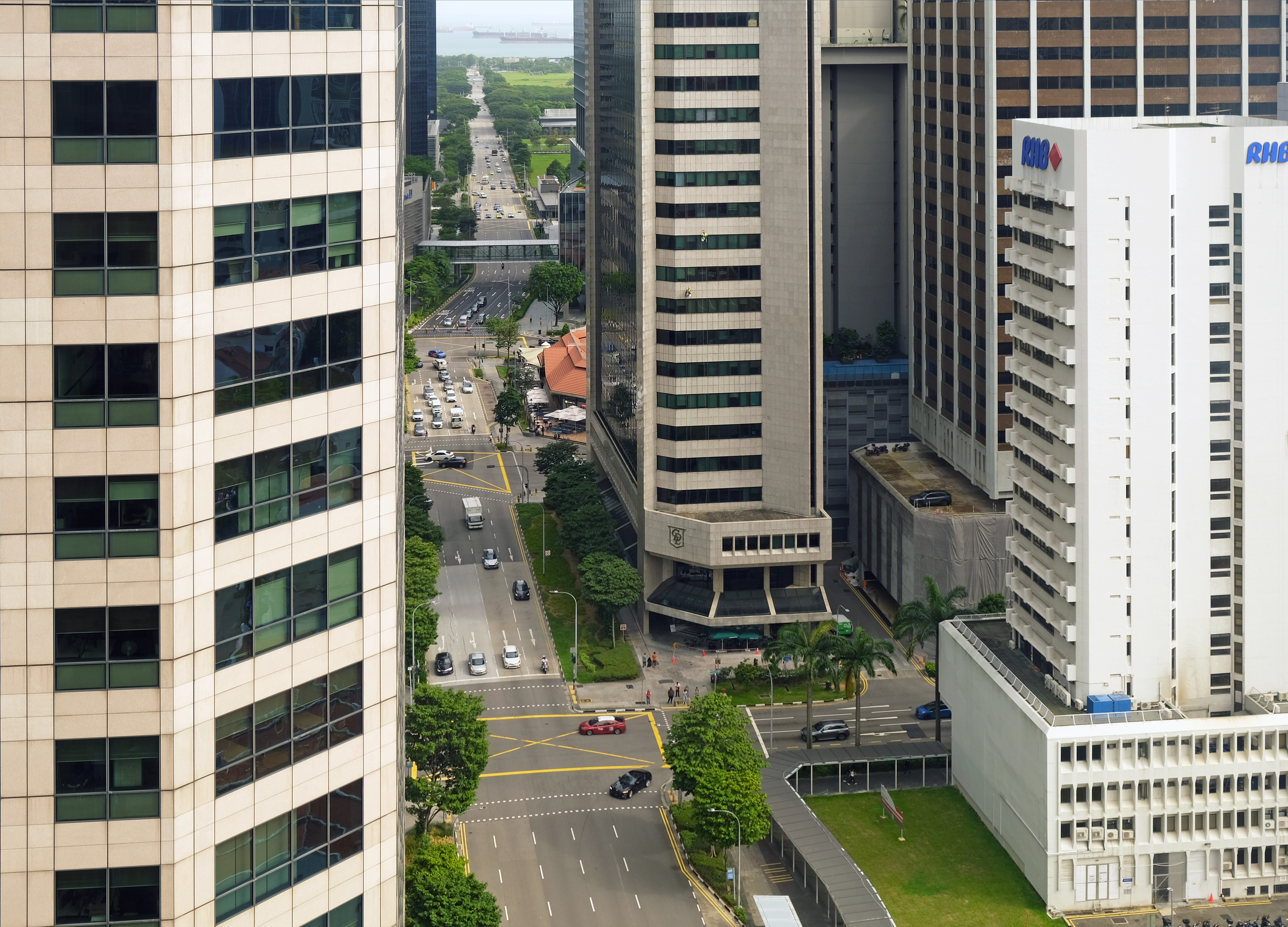
- Cross Street in Downtown Singapore
- Interactive map of Cross Street
- Coordinates: 1.2819°N 103.849°E

Construction
- Completed: 1819

Cross Street (Chinese: 克罗士街; Malay: Jalan Silang) is a street in Singapore starting from Shenton Way in Downtown Core and ending at the junction of South Bridge Road in Chinatown which is in Outram Planning Area which then becomes Upper Cross Street. At the start of the street, it houses Telok Ayer Market (more commonly known as Lau Pa Sat). A number of landmarks are located on the street including Far East Square and China Square Central.

== Etymology and history ==
The street, one of the oldest streets in Singapore, was built shortly after Sir Stamford Raffles founded modern Singapore in 1819, and appeared in Raffles' Town Plan of Chinatown.

Cross Street was originally an Indian residential area where Indian boatmen lived and operated their shops, mainly selling goat milk, mutton and herbs. As a result of the many milk shops, local Chinese called the street as kiat leng kia koi (kiat leng kia is a derogatory local term for Indians while koi (街) means street), or "Kling man's street" (kling is another derogatory local term for Indians), Tamils called it palkadei sadakku, or "street of the milk shops", while the Malays called it kampong susu or "milk village".

When Chinatown expanded, Cross Street becomes dominated by Chinese. In the 1950s till 1970s, the street consisted mainly of Chinese stationary and book shops.

== Landmarks ==
The prominent landmarks along Cross Street (from east to west):

- Lau Pa Sat
- City House
- Market Street Carpark
- Manulife Tower
- Telok Ayer MRT station
- Far East Square
- Ying Fo Fui Kun
- China Square Central
