= Outram, Singapore =

Planning area in Central Area, Singapore

Outram
- Planning Area

Other transcription(s)
  - Chinese: 欧南; Au-lâm (Hokkien POJ)
  - Pinyin: Ōu nán
  - Malay: Outram
  - Tamil: ஊட்ரம்
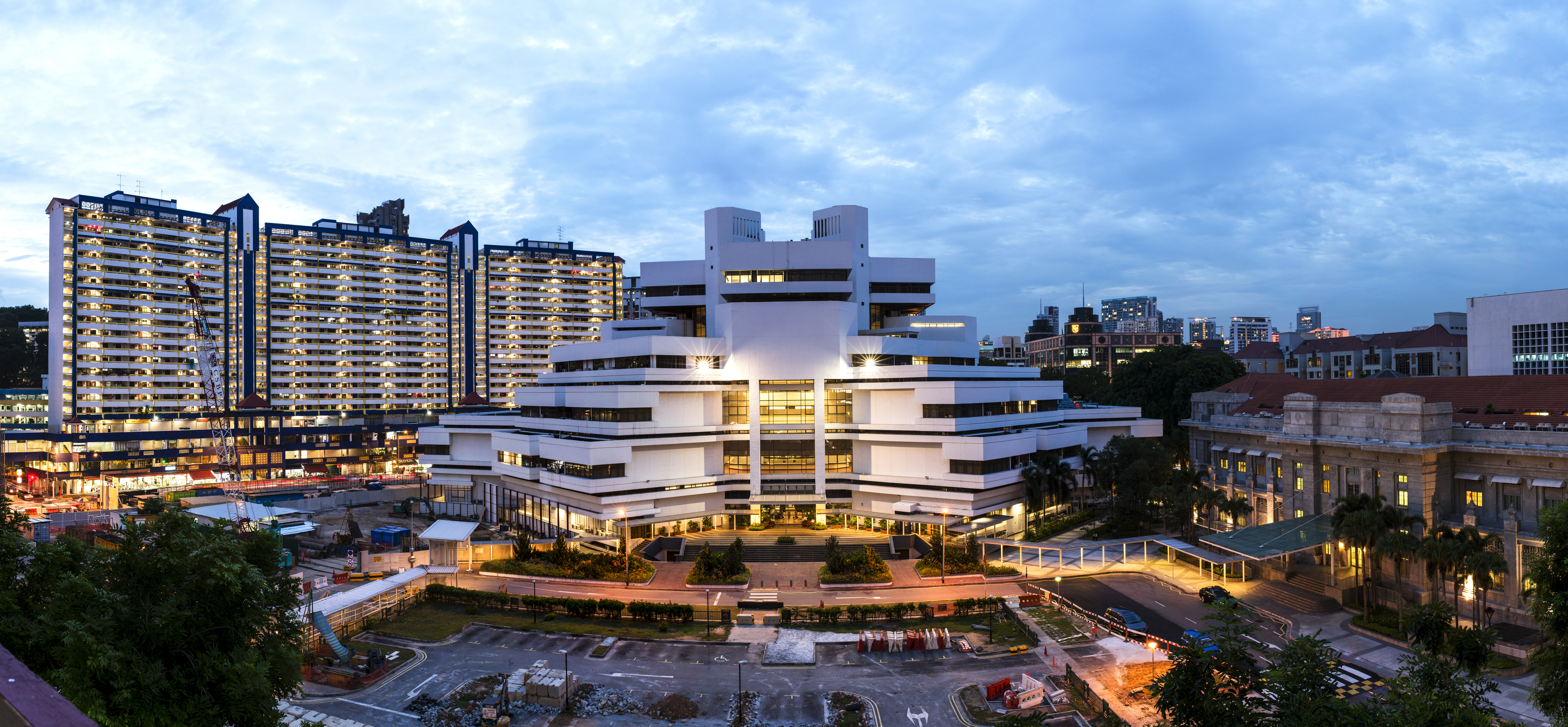
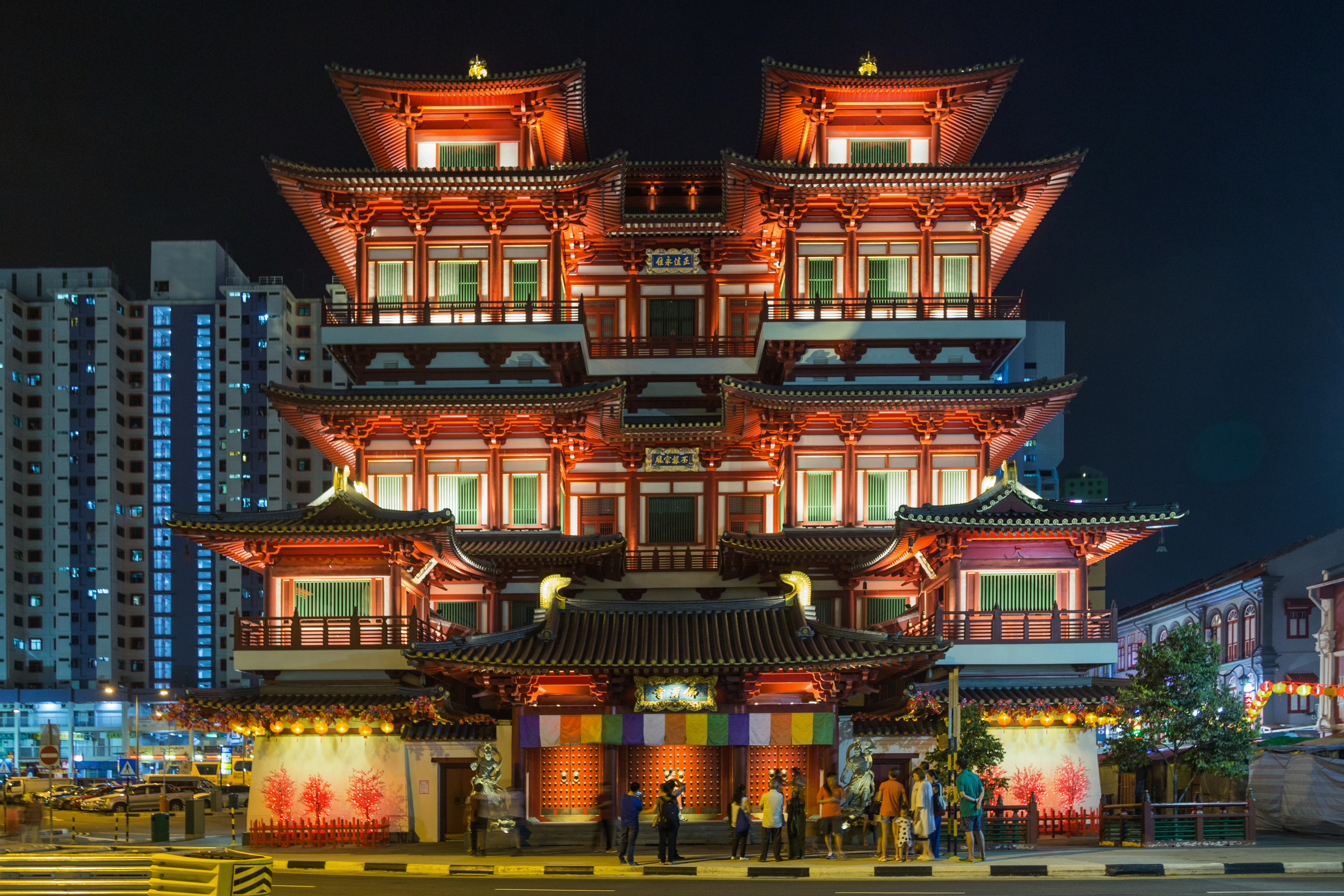
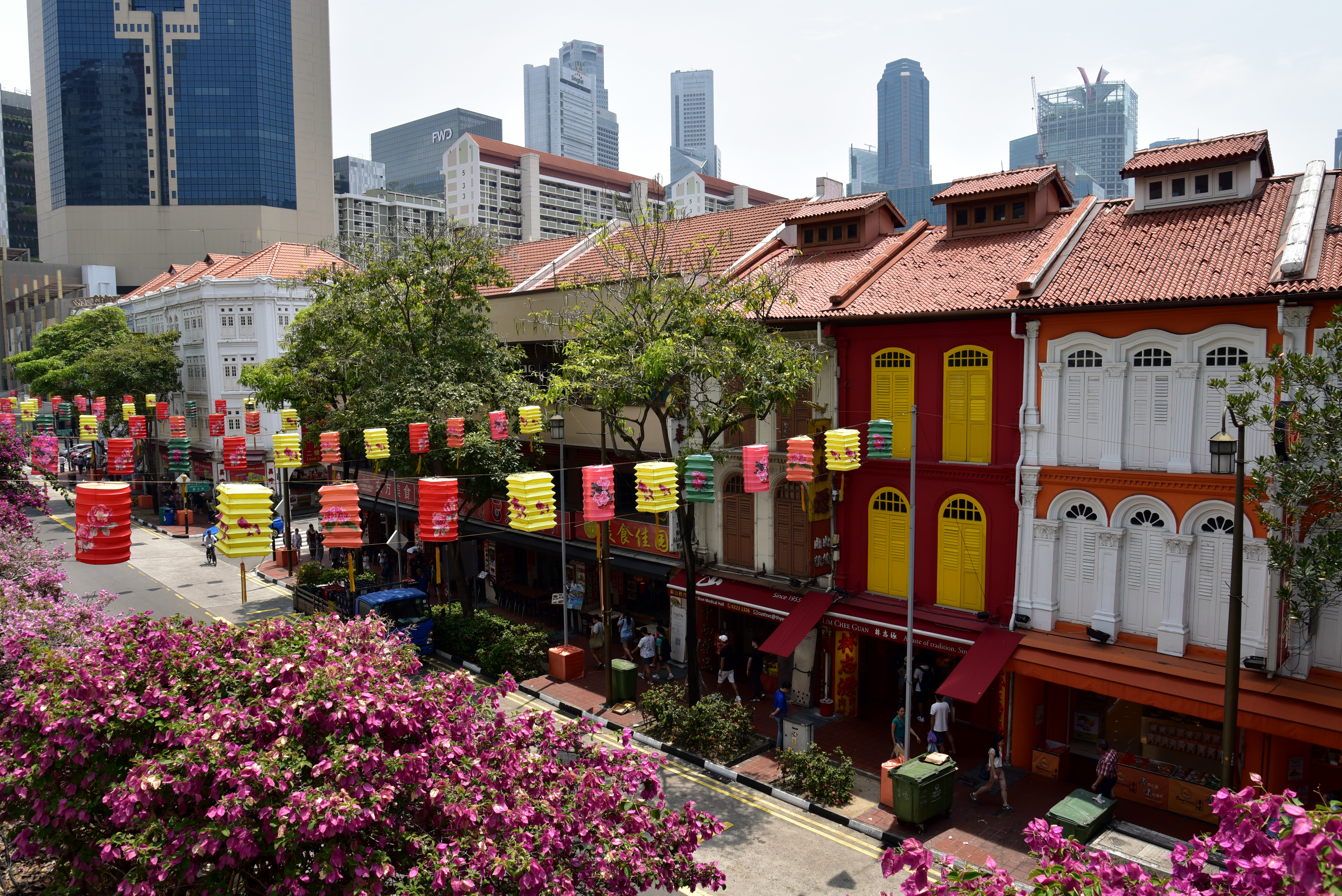
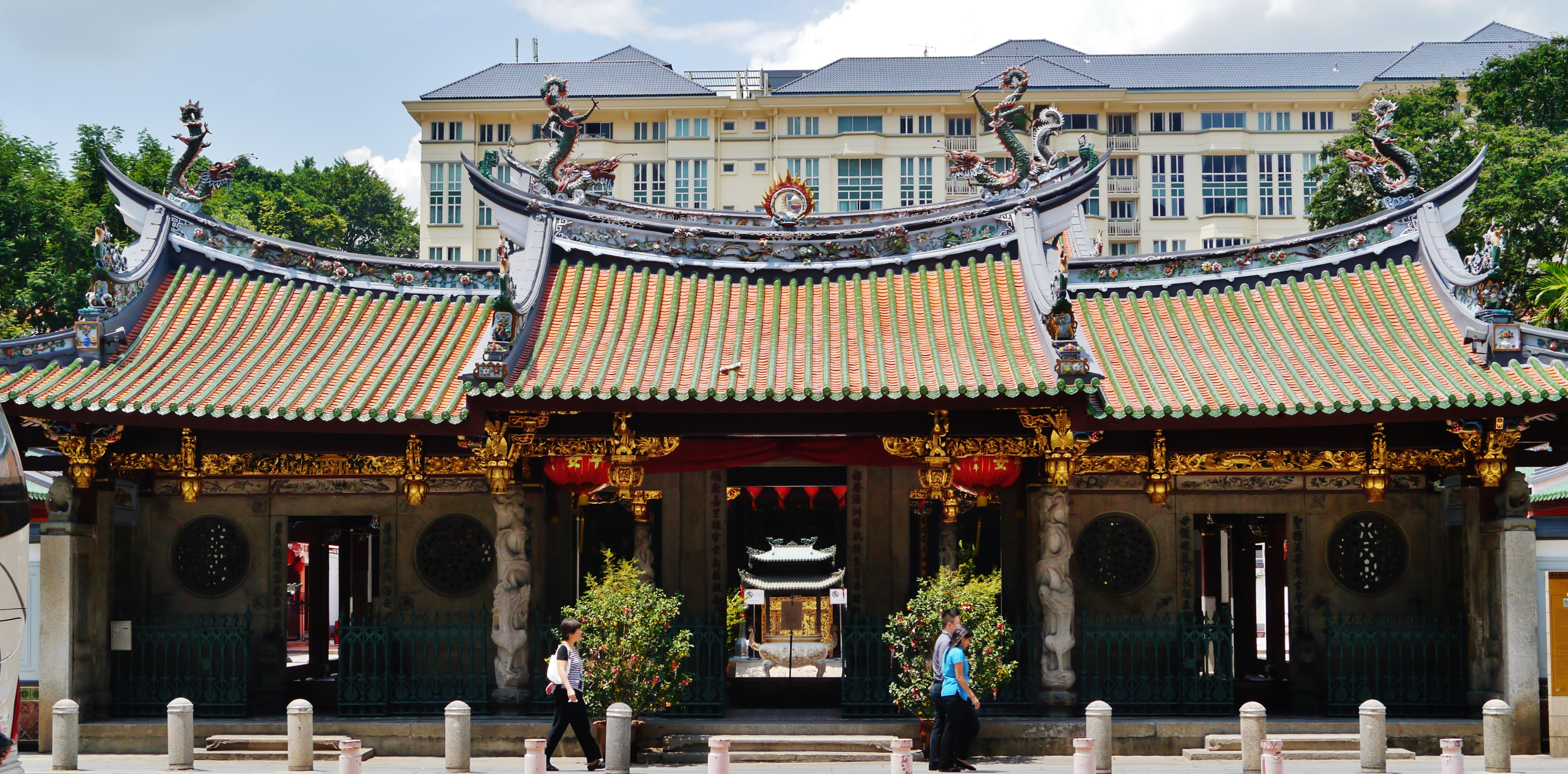
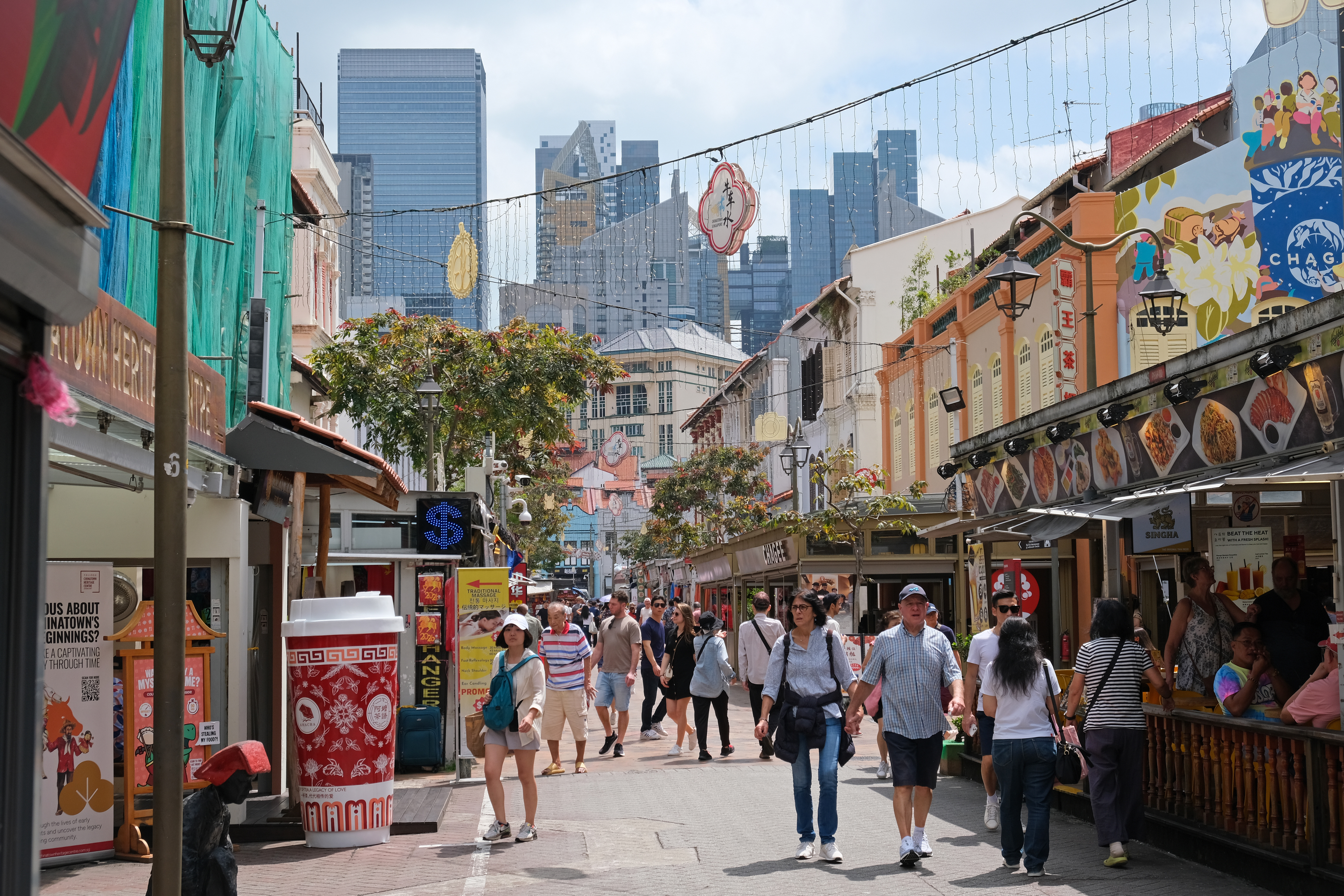
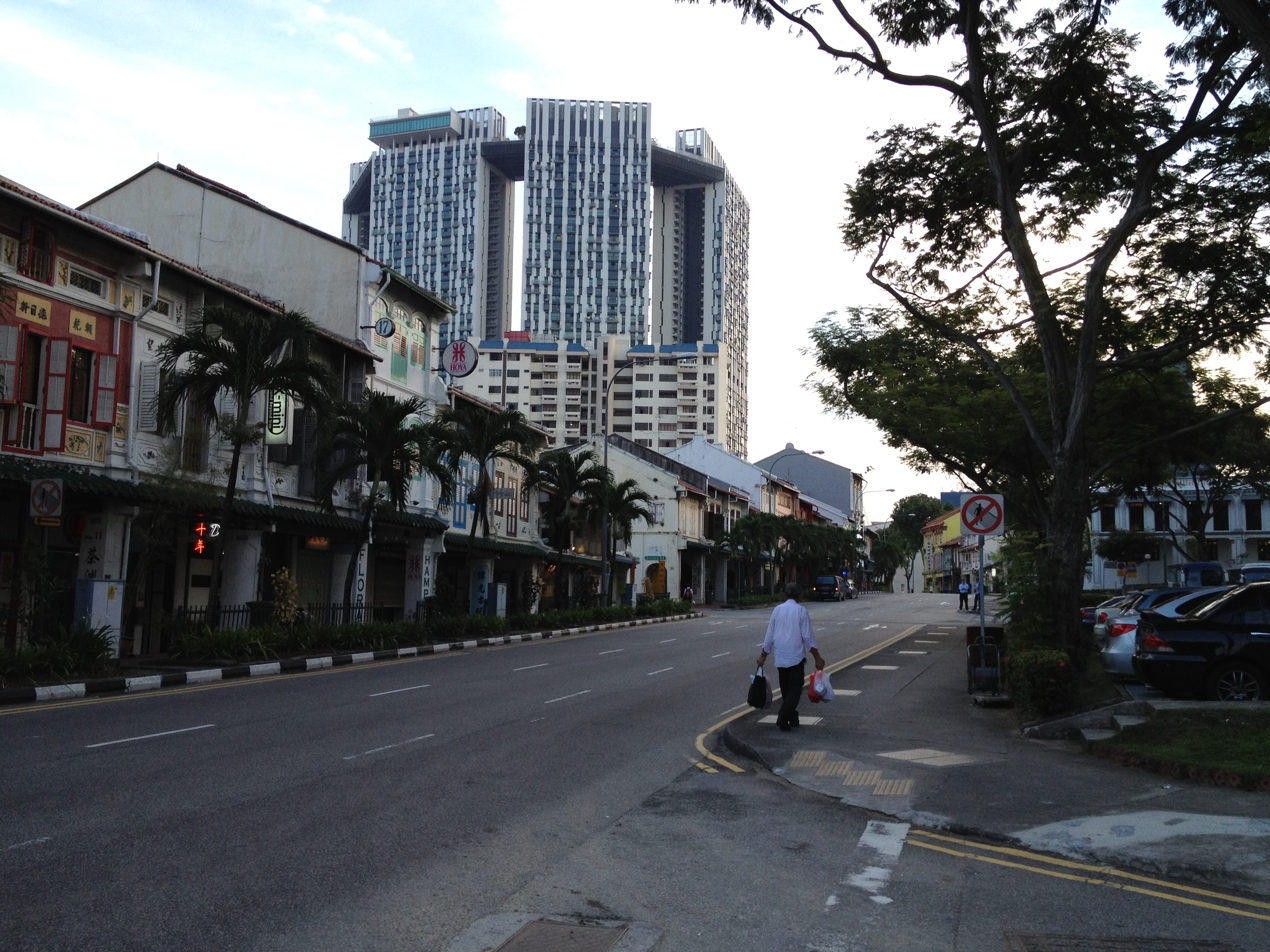
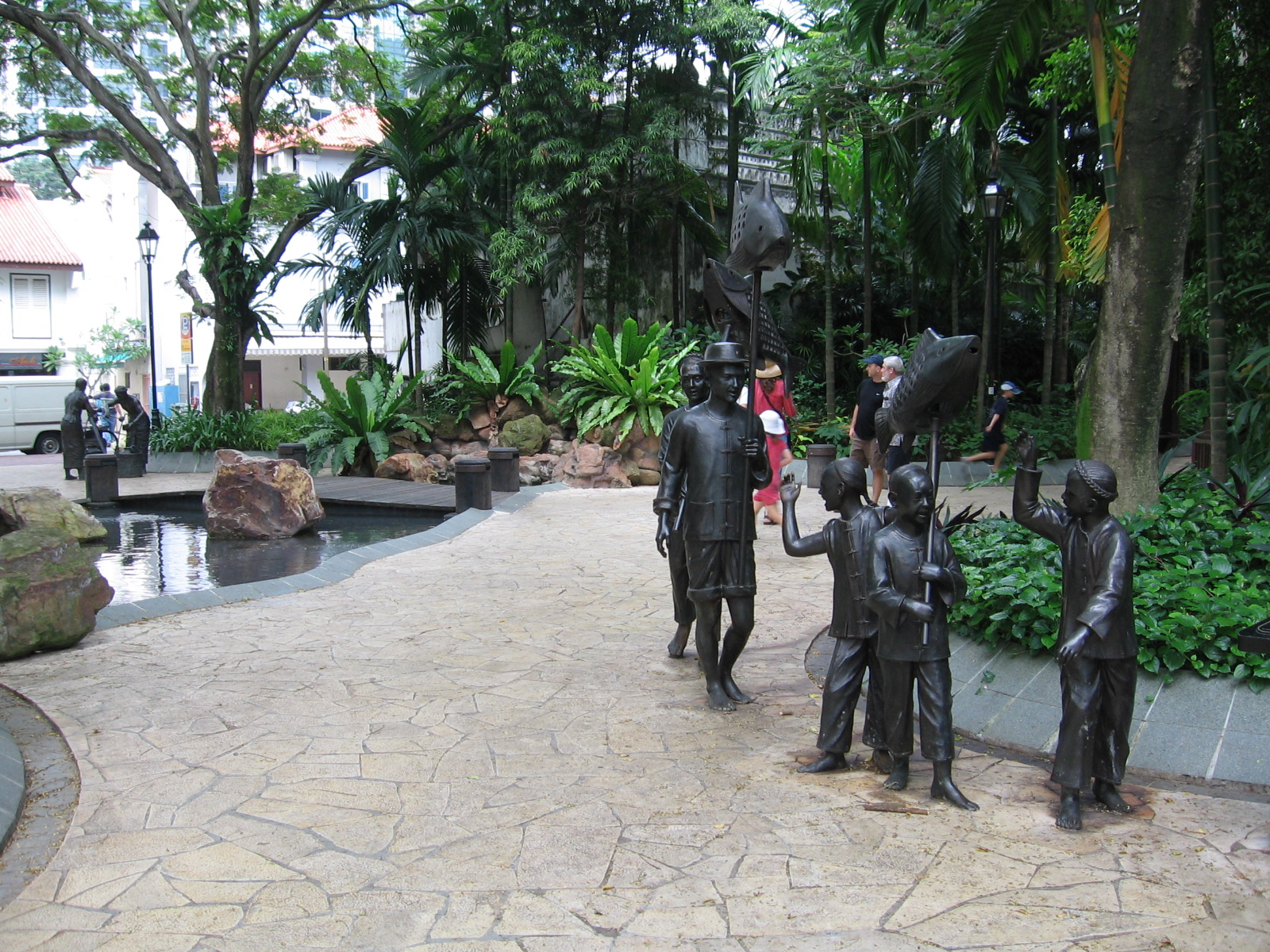
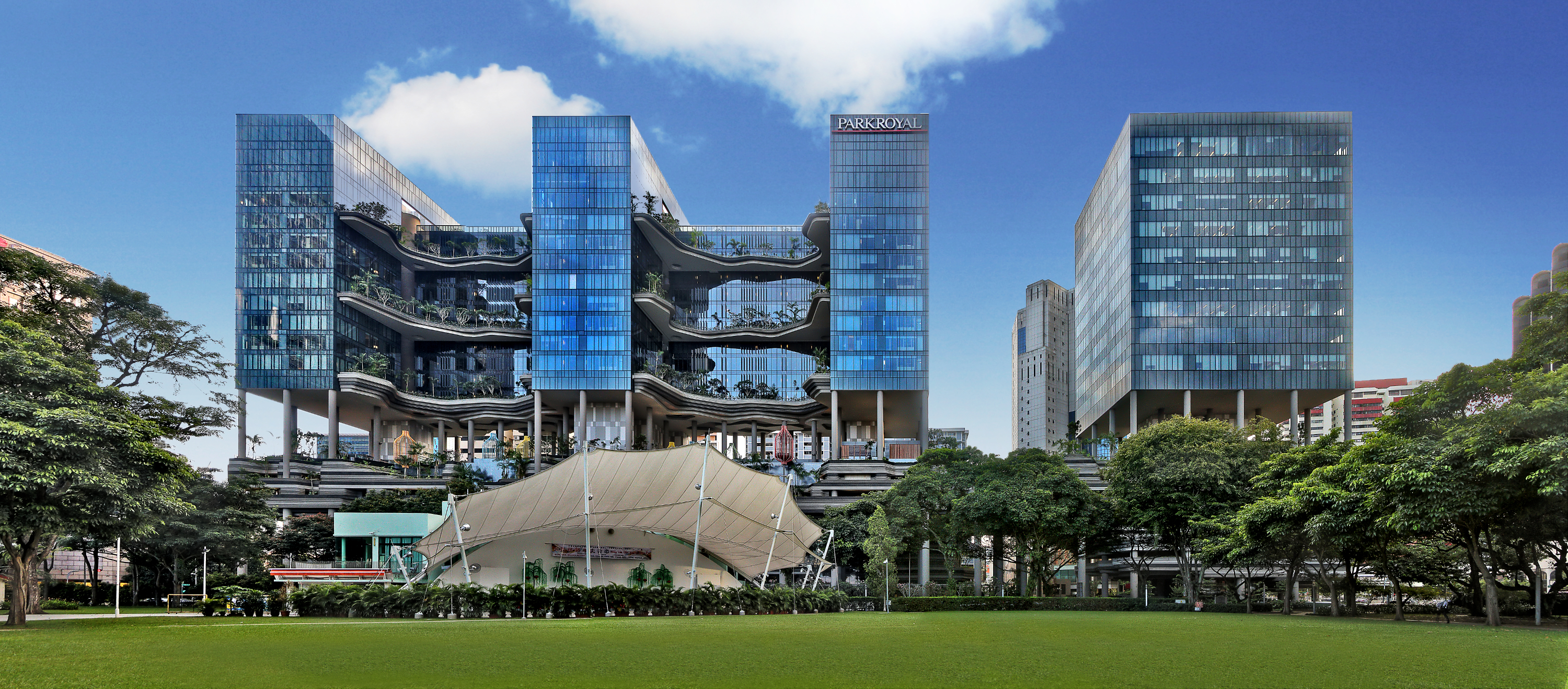
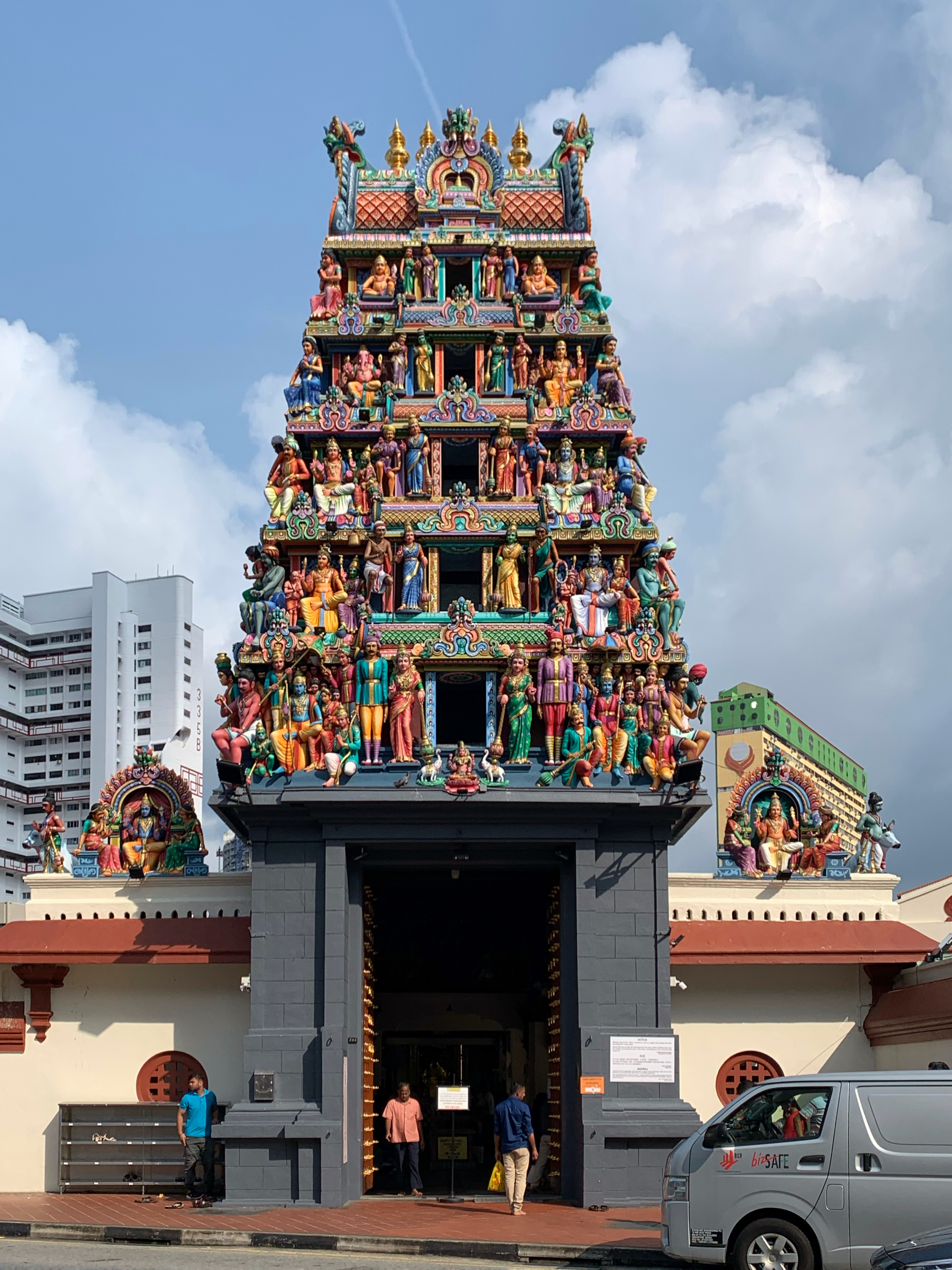
- State Courts of Singapore Buddha Tooth Relic Temple and Museum Shophouses in New Bridge Road Thian Hock Keng Temple Chinatown The Pinnacle@Duxton from Neil Road Telok Ayer Green Hong Lim Park with Parkroyal on Pickering and One Upper Pickering in the background Sri Mariamman Temple

- Location in Central Region

- Location of Outram within Singapore
- Coordinates: 1°17′5.6″N 103°50′38″E
- Country: Singapore
- Region: Central Region
- CDC: Central Singapore CDC
- Town council: Tanjong Pagar Town Council; Jalan Besar Town Council
- Constituency: Tanjong Pagar GRC; Jalan Besar GRC

Government
  - Mayor: Central Singapore CDC: Denise Phua
  - Members of Parliament: Tanjong Pagar GRC: Foo Cexiang; Jalan Besar GRC: Josephine Teo

Area
  - Total: 1.37 km^{2} (0.53 sq mi)
  - Rank: 51st

Population (2026)
  - Total: 17,010
  - Rank: 29th
  - Density: 12,400/km^{2} (32,200/sq mi)
  - Rank: 13th
- Demonym: Official: Outram resident
- Postal district: 3

Outram (/ˈuːtrəm/ OO-trəm (Note: locally also /ˈoʊtrəm, ˈaʊ-/ OH-trəm or OW-trəm)) is a planning area located within the Central Area of the Central Region of Singapore. The area is bordered by these planning areas: Singapore River to the north, the Downtown Core to the east and south, and Bukit Merah to the west. Outram comprises four subzones, China Square, Chinatown, People's Park and Pearl's Hill.

Outram is home to several key municipal buildings, such as Singapore General Hospital (SGH) and several other specialist health centres operated by Singapore Health Services (SingHealth) as well as the Central Narcotics Bureau and the Police Cantonment Complex. Outram Secondary School is situated in nearby York Hill. Across the Outram Road from the Outram Park MRT station is the Health Sciences Authority building. Along the same side of the road further down towards College Road, is Block 9 where Mortuary@HSA is located. At the junction of Outram Road and College Road stands the Alumni Building which at one time housed the Department of Scientific Services (DSS) before it was relocated to its present location in HSA Building.

== Etymology ==
Outram Road was named by the Municipality in 1858 after a British general, Sir James Outram (1803–1863), of the Indian rebellion of 1857 fame. The nearby Havelock Road was named in reference to Major-General Sir Henry Havelock. General Outram and General Havelock were two of the leaders in the British army during the Indian rebellion of 1857.

== History ==
Known as si pai poh in Hokkien, which means "Sepoy plain". The Sepoy Lines and police station and parade ground are at one end of Outram Road. Both designations of Sepoy Plain and Sepoy Lines refer to the public shooting of 47 sepoys at the wall of Outram Prison in 1915. This was in the aftermath of the 1915 Singapore Mutiny, which was quelled by local and British military forces.

Outram was once home to one of the earliest civil prisons in Singapore, Outram Prison. Located at the foot of Pearl's Hill, it was built in 1847 by Charles Edward Faber of the Madras Engineers. During the Japanese occupation in 1942, Outram Prison was briefly controlled by the Japanese and was used to hold prisoners of war. The prison was subsequently handed to the British forces following the end of the occupation. Outram Prison was eventually demolished in 1966 to make way for a housing project, Outram Park Complex, which was completed in 1970. It consisted of twelve 16-storey blocks together with a shopping complex. Outram Park Complex was selected for SERS in 1998 and was demolished by 2003, with its residents being relocated to Cantonment Towers in Everton Park. The land currently remains vacant and there are plans to revitalise Pearl's Hill, which includes building an integrated mixed-use development consisting of 6000 residential units, by the 2030s.

== Infrastructure ==
=== Transportation ===
==== Road ====
Main roads in Outram include:

- Eu Tong Sen Street, New Bridge Road, South Bridge Road, and Neil Road – These parallel, one-way roads run north-south and align with the North East line.
- Havelock Road, Upper Pickering Street, and Upper Cross Street – These roads run east-west provide access to Chinatown and the Downtown Core, linking to the Central Expressway (CTE).
- Outram Road – An alternative road connecting the Downtown Core to Bukit Merah and the CTE.

==== Mass Rapid Transit ====
Outram is served by four MRT stations, including:

- Outram Park MRT station – A triple-line interchange (East West line, North East line, and Thomson-East Coast line) located at the boundary of Pearl’s Hill and Bukit Merah.
- Chinatown MRT station – A major interchange station between the North East line and Downtown line, serving the Chinatown subzone.
- Maxwell MRT station – A Thomson-East Coast line station serving Chinatown and Maxwell.
- Telok Ayer MRT station – A Downtown line station on Cross Street, situated at the boundary between Outram and the Downtown Core.

=== Education ===
Outram is home to Outram Secondary School, the only government educational institution in the area until 2027. It is located on York Hill in the Pearl’s Hill subzone.

=== Tourist attractions ===
Outram features many historical and cultural landmarks, centered around Chinatown. Notable attractions include:

- Thian Hock Keng Temple – a temple built for the worship of Mazu, a Chinese sea goddess. Established from 1821 to 1822.
- Sri Mariamman Temple – Singapore's oldest Hindu temple, established in 1827, known for its elaborate gopuram (entrance tower).
- Buddha Tooth Relic Temple and Museum – A Buddhist temple and museum built in the Tang dynasty architectural style.
- Chinatown Heritage Centre – Museum showcasing the history of early Chinese immigrants in Singapore.

=== Commercial ===
Outram’s commercial areas concentrated around Chinatown, with several shopping malls and mixed-use developments, including:

- Chinatown Point
- People’s Park Centre
- People’s Park Complex
- OG People’s Park

== Housing ==
While much of Outram’s land is zoned for commercial use, several residential precincts exist within the district, including Duxton, Kreta Ayer, York Hill, and Upper Cross Street. Housing developments in Outram comprise a mix of Housing and Development (HDB) flats and private condominiums.

Notable housing projects in Outram include The Pinnacle@Duxton, a 50-storey residential development. The Pinnacle@Duxton is notably one of the tallest public housing developments in Singapore and has won multiple architectural awards. Other public housing areas in Outram include older HDB flats around York Hill and Upper Cross Street.

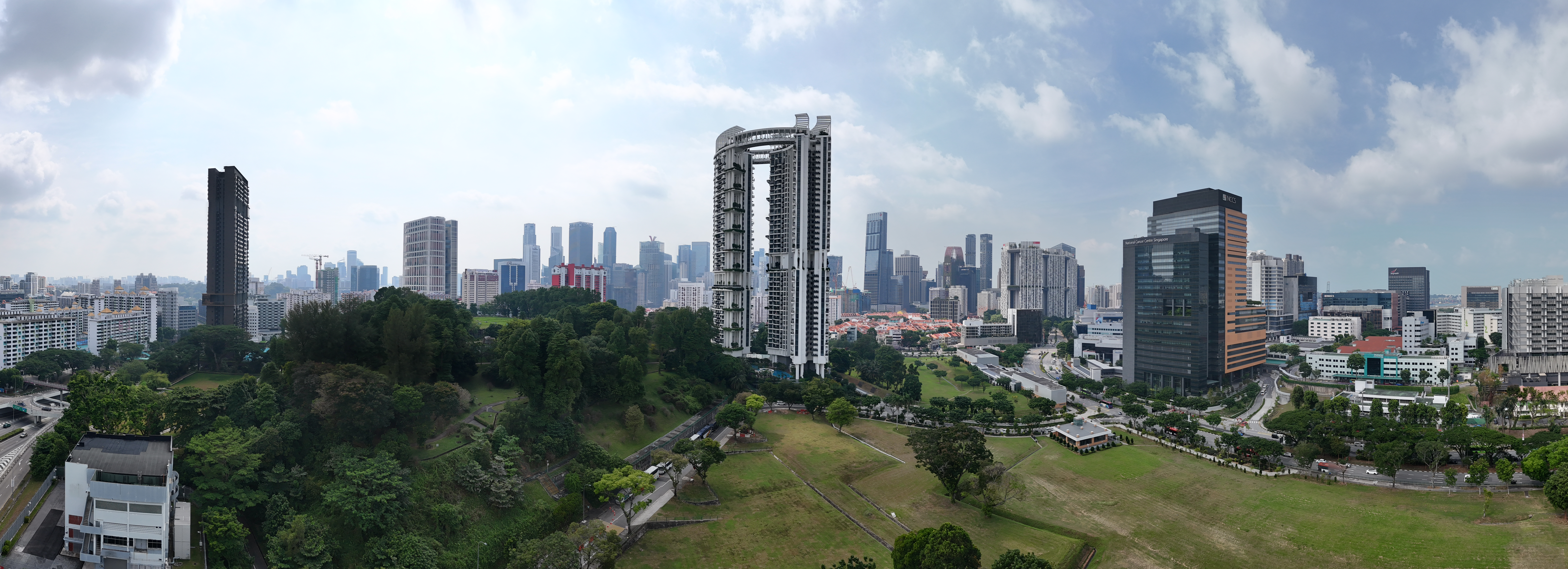
Panorama of Outram Park with One Pearl Bank in the centre

In addition to public housing, Outram features several private residential developments. One Pearl Bank, a 39-storey condominium completed in 2024, replaces the iconic Pearl Bank Apartments. People’s Park Complex, completed in 1973, is a mixed-use development located in the heart of Chinatown, next to Chinatown MRT station.

== Politics ==
Outram is divided into two constituencies, Tanjong Pagar Group Representation Constituency and Jalan Besar Group Representation Constituency. The residential precincts in Tanjong Pagar and Duxton Plain of Chinatown subzone fall under Tanjong Pagar-Tiong Bahru division of Tanjong Pagar GRC, which was managed by Foo Cexiang, while the rest of Outram falls under the Kreta Ayer-Kim Seng division of the Jalan Besar GRC, which was managed by Josephine Teo.
