= People's Park Centre =

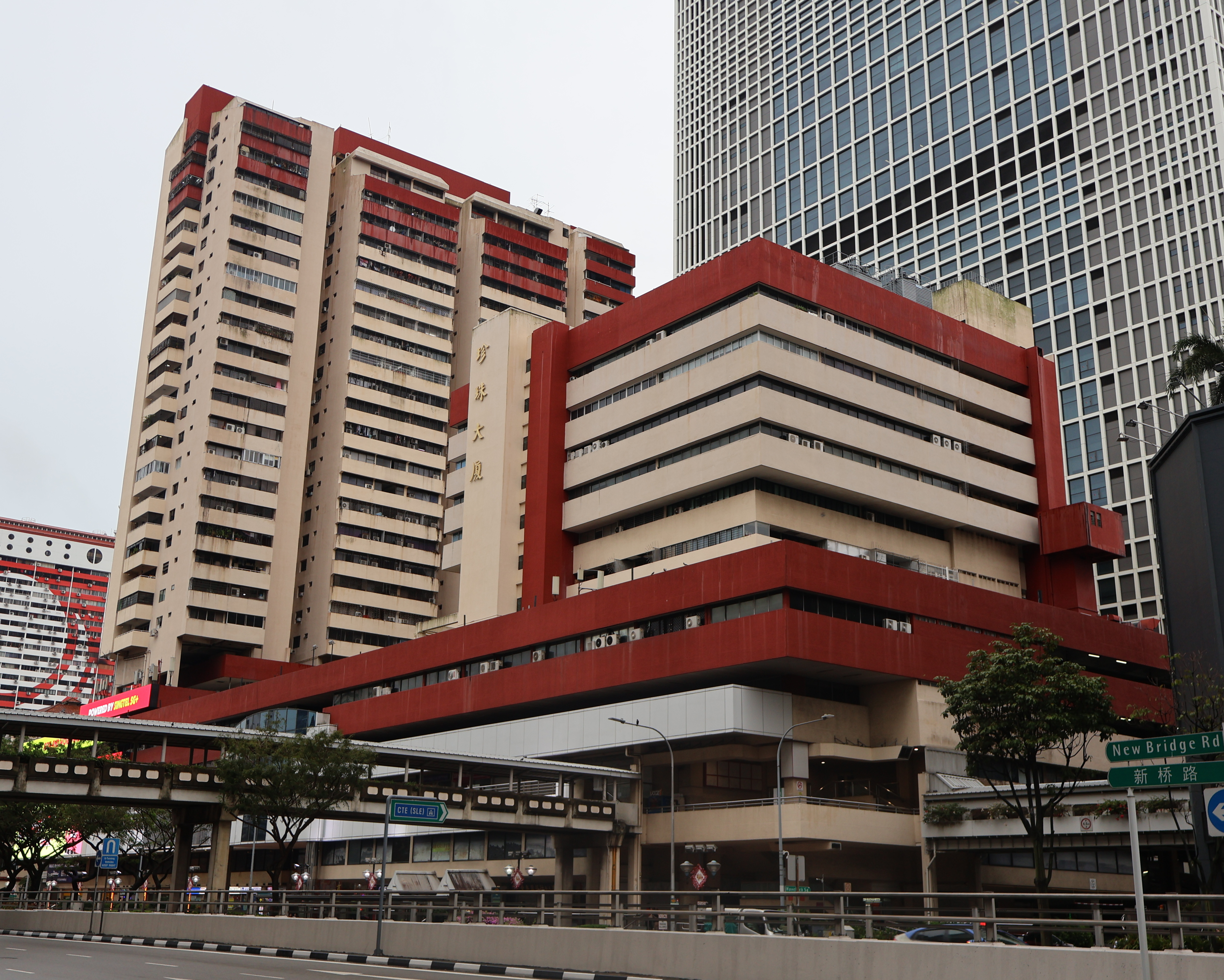
- Location: Outram, Singapore
- Coordinates: 1°17′9.039″N 103°50′37.914″E
- Address: 101 Upper Cross Street, Singapore 058357
- Opened: 1976; 50 years ago
- Manager: HBA Group Property Consultants Pte Ltd
- Owner: Management Corporation Strata Title 0393
- Public transit: NE4 DT19 Chinatown

People's Park Centre is a mixed-use development, strata-titled development located at the junction of Eu Tong Sen Street and Upper Cross Street in Outram, Singapore next to Chinatown MRT station. It has a mix of residential units, shops and offices. Constructed on the land sold in the first Government Land Sales (GLS) programme, People's Park Centre marks an important chapter in the architectural history of post-independence Singapore. Completed in 1976, the centre is now slated for redevelopment.

== History ==
In 1967, the Singapore Government started the Government Land Sales (GLS) programme. Three plots of land are up for public tender for the first time, each on 99-years leasehold. One of the plot was subsequently developed into People's Park Centre. This was an important chapter in the architectural history of post-independent Singapore. The Singapore Land Authority, a statutory board under the Ministry of Law, stated the objective for such GLS was to develop tourism. Therefore, the land was tendered for commercial usage. Construction began afterwards and the centre was completed in 1973.

The centre is a strata-titled development in which the Centre ownership is subdivided into units (shops, offices or residential) with each of the owner of a unit called a Subsidiary Proprietor (SP). The common areas (such as access corridors, lifts) are shared by the SPs. Under Singapore Building Maintenance and Strata Management Act, the SPs need to form a Management Corporation Strata Title (MCST) collectively. The MCST formed must hold Annual General Meetings to decide on matters pertaining to the Centre maintenance and management. The MCST of the centre was formed on the 28 March 1978 (MCST 0393). HBA Group Property Consultants is currently appointed to maintain the centre by the MCST.

== Layout ==
Located along Upper Cross Street in Outram, Singapore, People's Park Centre is a mixed-use development which is made up of residential units, shops and offices. For the retail component, there are a total of 247 shops. In a 1984 survey conducted by National University of Singapore, out of these there are 38 convenience shops, 170 retail shops as well as 39 specialty shops. There are a couple of law firms that occupies the offices in the centre, such as the branch office of Eugene Thuraisingam LLP.

== Redevelopment ==
The centre is planned for redevelopment. A collective sales committee is established and a property agency will be appointed to handle the redevelopment. It is reported that around half of the owners of the Centre attended the last meeting and majority is in favour of the sales.

== See also ==
- People's Park Complex
