= Library@chinatown =

Public Library in Singapore

library@chinatown
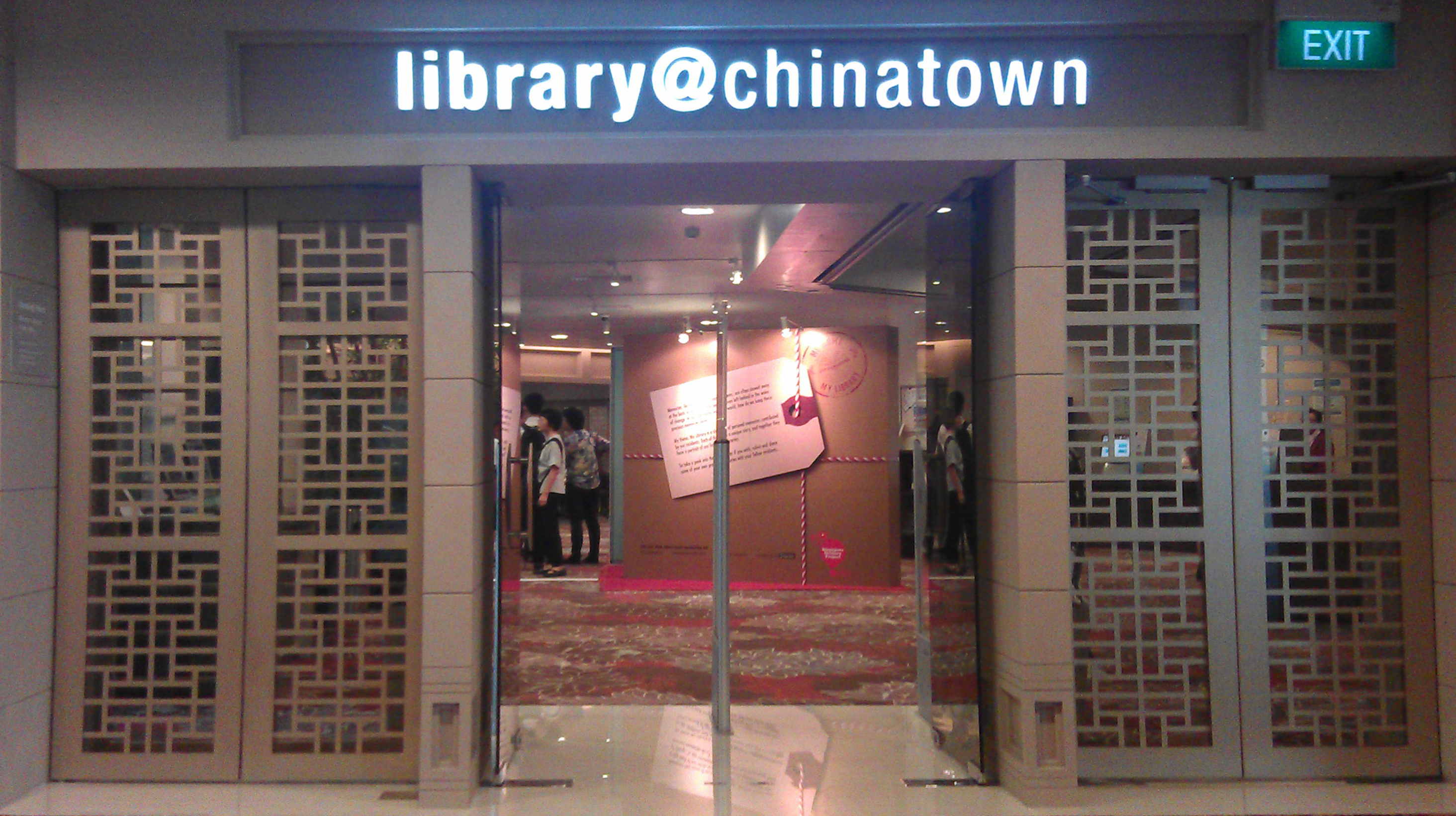
- Entrance to the library
- 1°17′07″N 103°50′41″E
- Location: 133 New Bridge Road, #04-12, Chinatown Point, Singapore 059413, Singapore
- Type: Public library
- Scope: Chinese arts and culture
- Established: 31 January 2013; 13 years ago (Note: The library was completed in 2012 and opened on 31 January 2013.)
- Branch of: National Library Board

Collection
- Size: 44,000

Other information
- Public transit access: NE4 DT19 Chinatown
- Website: Official Website

library@chinatown is a library in Chinatown, Singapore. It is located inside Chinatown Point. The nearest MRT station is Chinatown MRT station.

== History ==
The library was officially opened on 31 January 2013 by then Acting Minister for Culture, Community and Youth and Senior Minister of State, Ministry of Communications and Information Mr Lawrence Wong. It is NLB's first library run by volunteers. The library was designed by Multiply Architects LLP and the library was completed in 2012.

== Layout ==
The library is on the 4th floor of the mall. There is a small section of materials in commonly spoken Chinese varieties. There is a section for electronic newspapers.

== Gallery ==
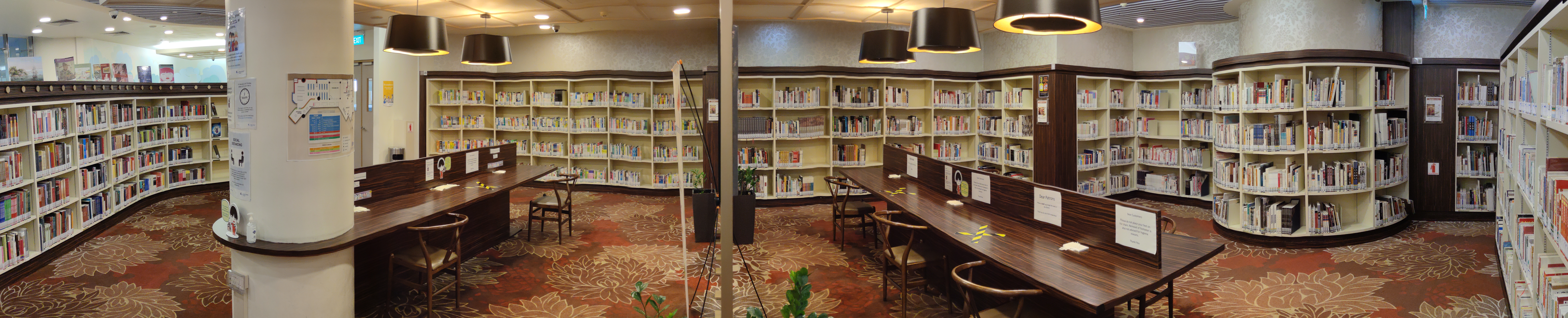
Study Area, library@chinatown

== See also ==
- National Library Board
- Libraries in Singapore
