= Upper Cross Street =

Street in Singapore

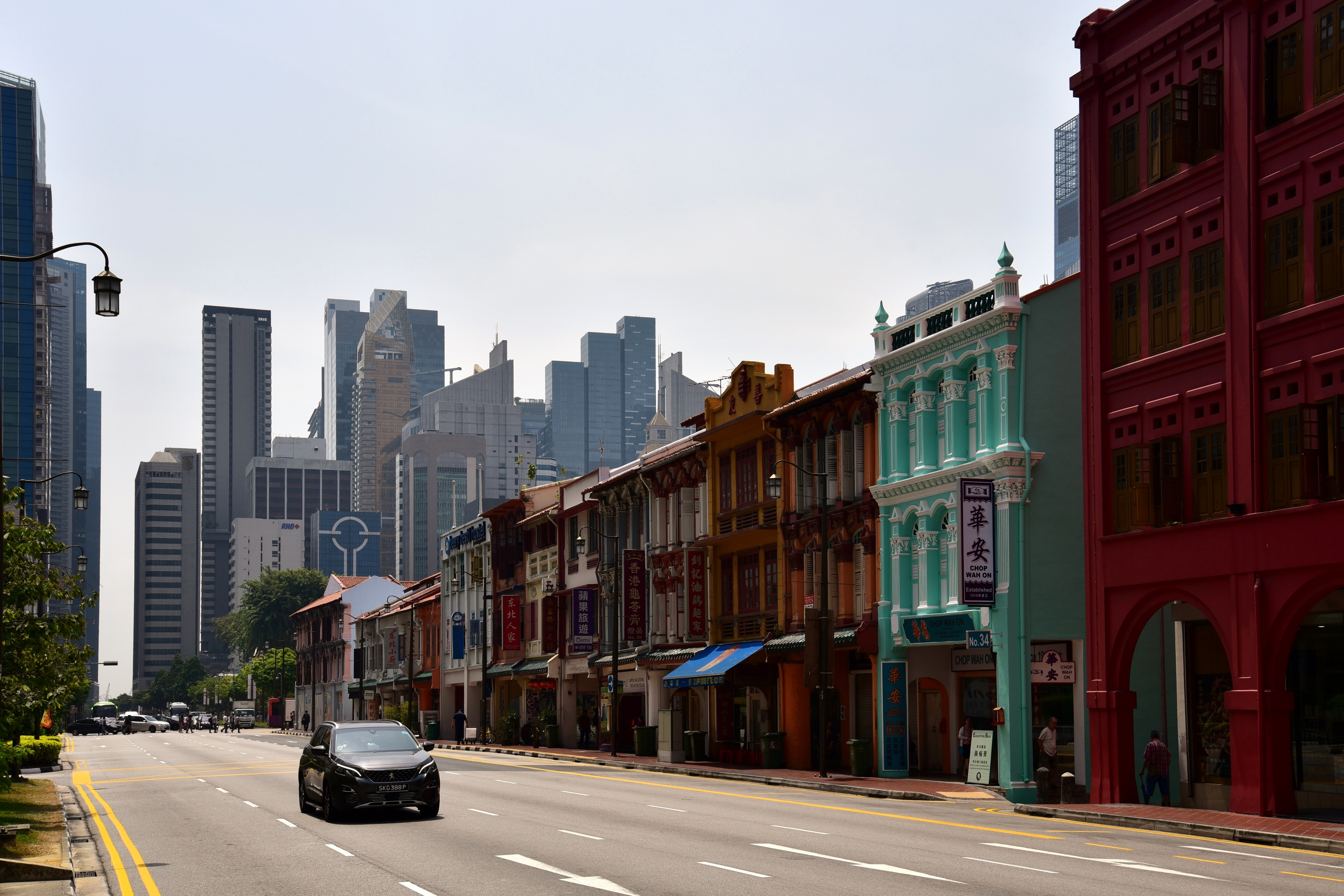
Upper Cross Street

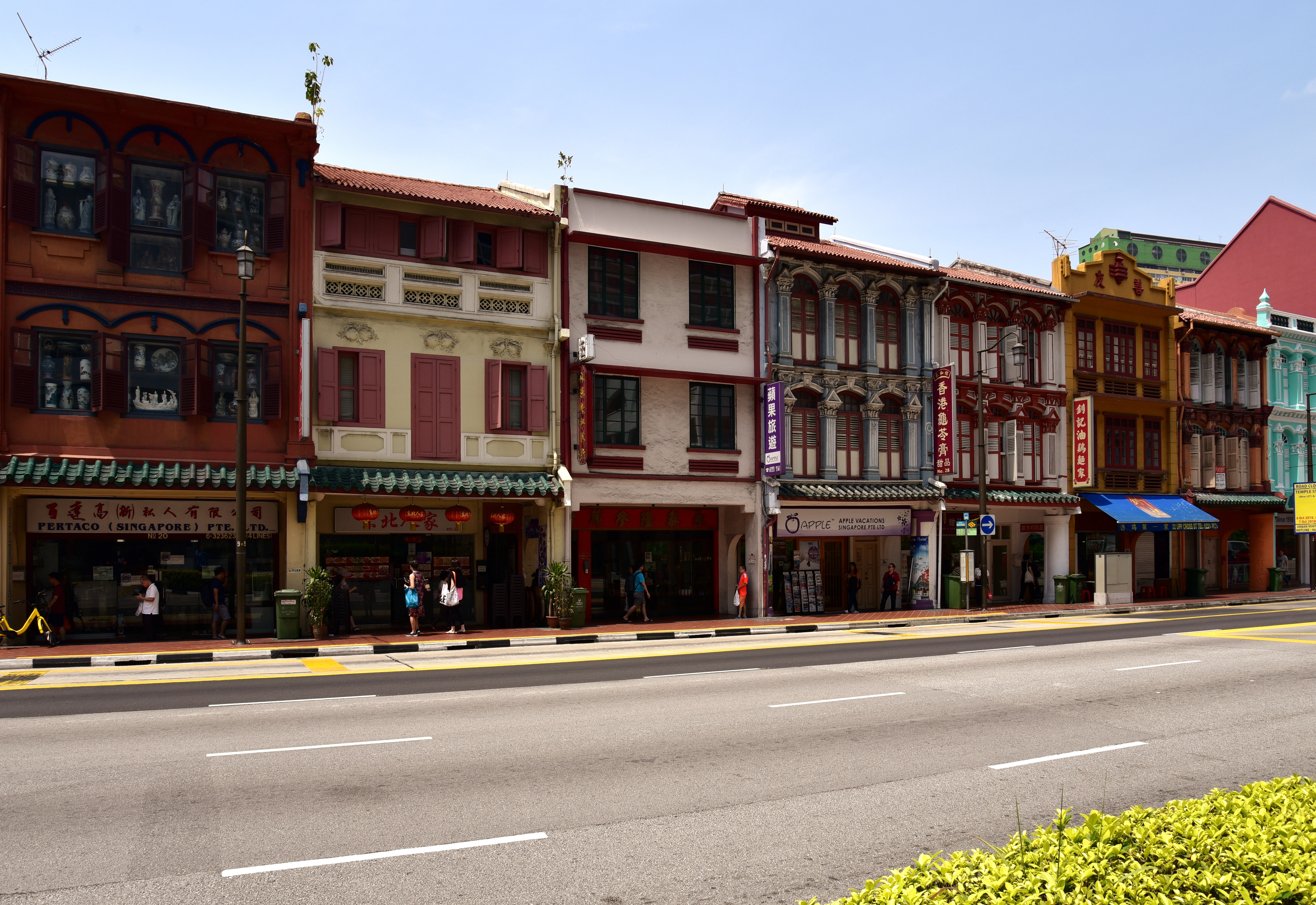
A row of shophouses on Upper Cross Street.

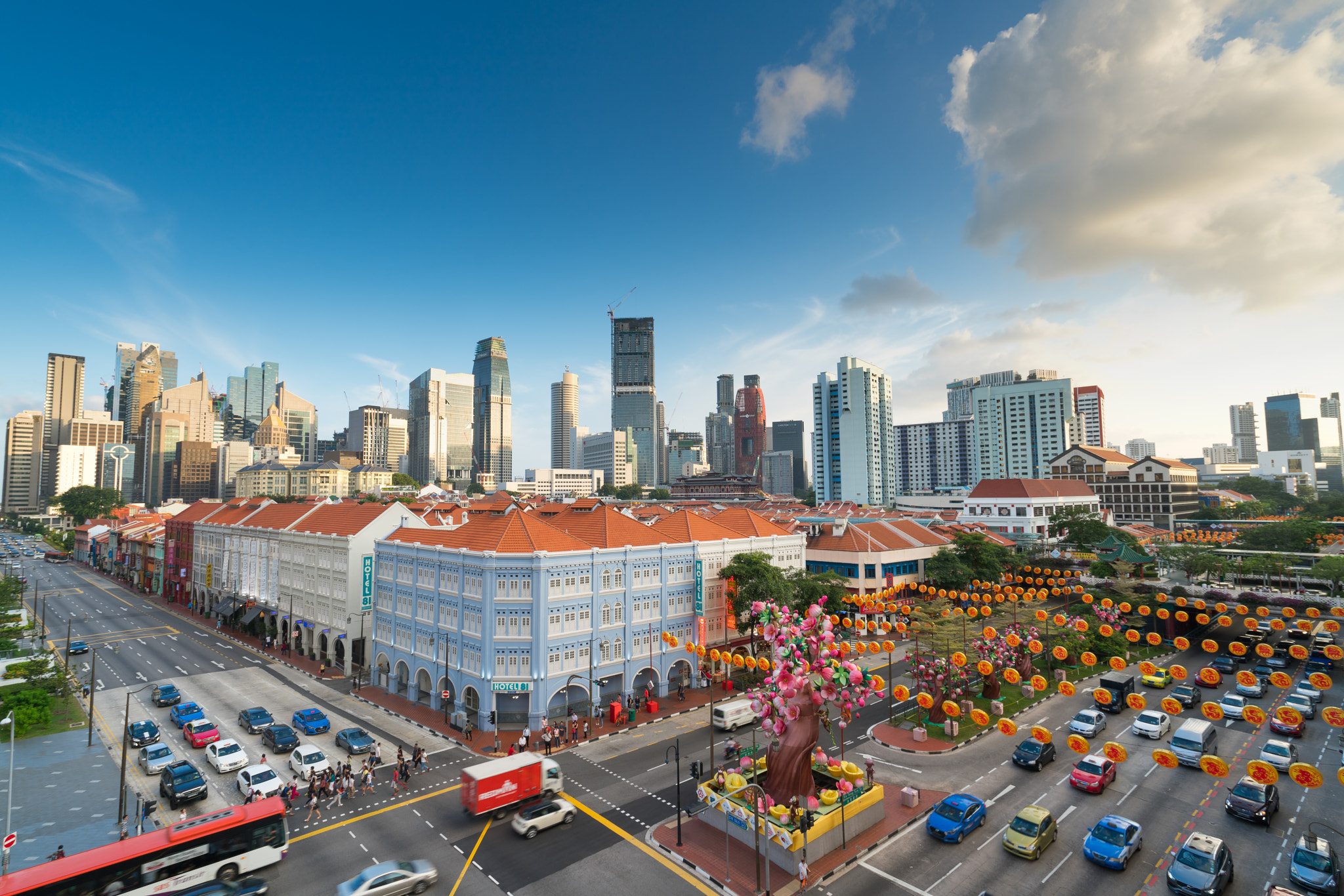
Junction with New Bridge Road and Eu Tong Sen Street

Upper Cross Street (Chinese: 克罗士街上段) is a street located in Chinatown within the Outram Planning Area in Singapore. The street starts after Cross Street at the junction of Cross Street and South Bridge Road, with the street ending at the junction of Chin Swee Road, Havelock Road and Clemenceau Avenue. The street then continues on to Havelock Road. There are a number of shophouses on the street, housing restaurants and shops, with a Spring Court restaurant along the street. The Housing and Development Board development, Hong Lim Complex is also located on this street. Other landmarks include Yue Hwa Building (the former Great Southern Hotel), OG People's Park, Hotel 81 Chinatown, Chinatown Point and the Subordinate Courts. The entrance to the Central Expressway towards the north.

== Landmarks ==
These are the prominent landmarks along Upper Cross Street (from east to west).

- Hong Lim Complex
- Beary Best! Hostel
- Chinatown MRT station
- Chinatown Point
- Spring Court restaurant
- Hotel 81 Chinatown
- Yue Hwa Building (Former Great Southern Hotel)
- OG People's Park
- People's Park Centre
- State Courts Building
- People's Park Food Centre and HDB estate
