= Family Justice Courts =

Singapore courts that rule over family law

- Jurisdiction: Singapore
- Location: Family Justice Courts, No 3 Havelock Square, Singapore 059725
- Composition method: Judges are appointed by the President upon the recommendation of the Chief Justice
- Website: https://www.judiciary.gov.sg

Presiding Judge
- Currently: Justice Teh Hwee Hwee
- Since: 1 October 2023

The Family Justice Courts (FJC) is a grouping of courts in the judicial system of Singapore that comprises the Youth Courts, Family Courts and High Court (Family Division). The Youth Courts hear cases related to children and young persons, the Family Courts hear all family proceedings except cases that fall under the Youth Courts, and the Family Division of the High Court primarily hears appeals against the decisions of the Family Courts and the Youth Courts.

The FJC applies the principles of Therapeutic Justice, an approach focused on interest-based problem-solving for families, rather than fault-finding between parties. The FJC aims to make justice accessible to families and youth through effective counselling, mediation, and adjudication, with a commitment to delivering justice that protects, empowers, and restores.

== History ==
In 2013, the Committee for Family Justice was formed to review how Singapore's family justice system may be reformed to address the needs of youth and families in distress. It recommended setting up the Family Justice Court.

The Family Justice Courts of Singapore are established pursuant to the Family Justice Act which was passed by the Singapore Parliament on 4 August 2014.

== Legislation ==
The FJC deals with cases involving the following legislations:

- Family Justice Act 2014
- Administration of Muslim Law Act 1966
- Adoption of Children Act 1939
- Children and Young Persons Act 1993
- Criminal Procedure Code 2010
- Guardianship of Infants Act 1934
- Inheritance (Family Provision) Act 1966
- International Child Abduction Act 2010
- Intestate Succession Act 1967
- Legitimacy Act 1934
- Maintenance of Parents Act 1995
- Maintenance Orders (Reciprocal Enforcement) Act 1975
- Mental Capacity Act 2008
- Mental Health (Care and Treatment) Act 2008
- Probate and Administration Act 1934
- Status of Children (Assisted Reproduction Technology) Act 2013
- Supreme Court of Judicature Act 1969
- Voluntary Sterilization Act 1974
- Wills Act 1838
- Women's Charter 1961

It handled a total of 26,560 cases in 2021.

== iFAMS and other Case Management Systems ==
Integrated Family Application Management System (iFAMS) is an end-to-end paperless system that predominantly deals with family-related cases brought before FJC. Other cases are dealt with in the e-Litigation system that handles most non-criminal cases filed in Singapore court.

A simplified application process for certain types of uncontested divorces has been launched. This eService is designed to allow lay-persons to file for such divorces directly, without needing to engage a lawyer.

Another simplified eService has also been launched, to deal with simpler Probate applications. These are applications that can be taken out when a person has died, leaving behind a will that has named an Executor to carry out the wishes of the deceased person.
