= Chinatown Point =

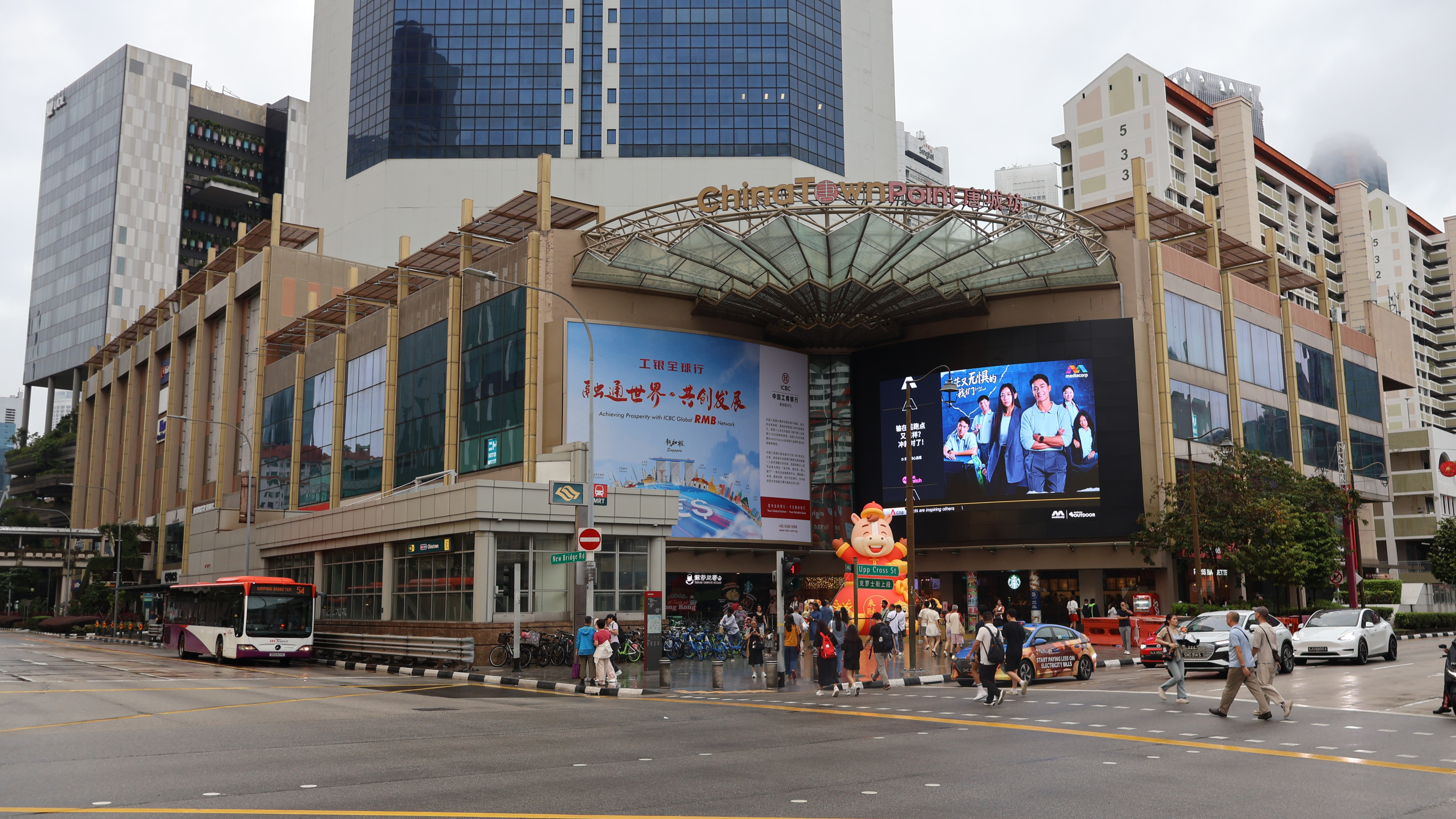
- Chinatown Point in 2026
- Location: Chinatown, Singapore
- Coordinates: 1°17′7″N 103°50′42″E
- Address: 133 New Bridge Road, Singapore 059413
- Opened: 1990; 36 years ago
- Manager: Perennial (Singapore) Retail Management
- Owner: Perennial Real Estate Holdings; SEB; NTUC FairPrice; Singapore Press Holdings
- Num. of stores: 170
- Num. of anchor tenants: 3
- Floor area: 205,000 square feet (19,000 m^{2})
- Floors: 27 (6 retail floors inclusive of 2 basements (B2 to L4), 4 parking floors (L3 to L6), 18 office floors (L7 to L25))
- Public transit: NE4 DT19 Chinatown
- Website: www.chinatownpoint.com.sg

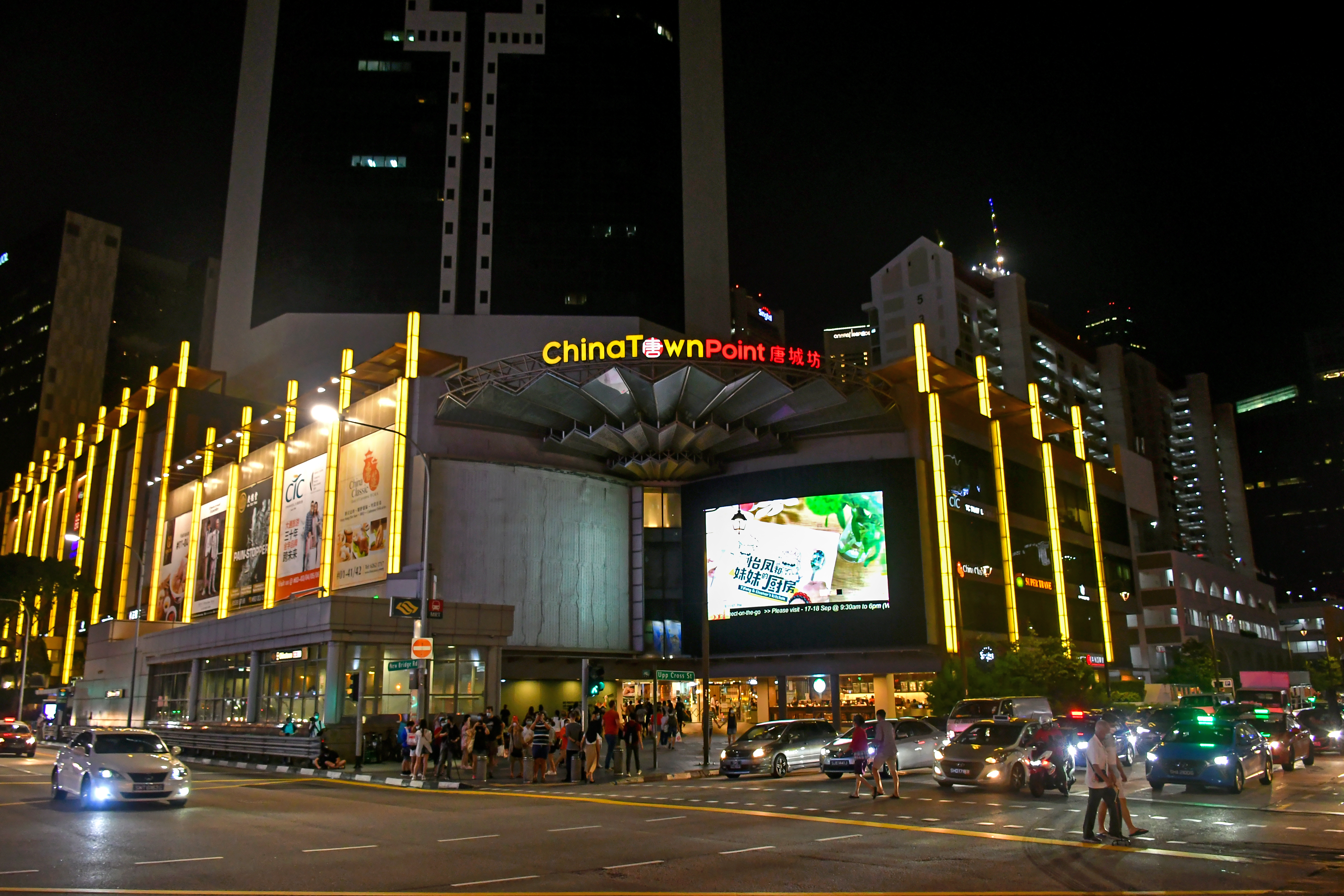
External evening view from New Bridge Road. September 2020.

Chinatown Point is a shopping mall located in Chinatown, Singapore next to Chinatown MRT station at the junction of New Bridge Road and Upper Cross Street. It is a mixed development which includes a 25-storey office tower located right above the mall. Constructed in the 1980s, the mall opened in 1990. From 2011 to 2012, the mall underwent renovations after a change in the management. It held its soft core launch in year-end 2012 and was fully operational in the 2nd quarter of 2013.

== History ==
When it first opened, the mall was at the forefront of shopping in Singapore. There were countless curio shops, pawn shops and jewelry stores. Like many old malls in Singapore, the shopping centre declined in popularity when newer malls opened within the region.

In July 2010, the mall was bought over from City Developments Limited by Perennial (Singapore) Retail Management for S$250 million. The mall then underwent a S$90 million makeover from 2011 to 2012 which increased its total retail floor area by 18 percent.

== Architecture ==
Originally, the mall featured 2 spiralling podiums. One of the podiums was converted into a flat space and it now features a spiralling central atrium, where shoppers can walk from the highest level of the shopping mall to the first level. Other renovation works included the installation of a dome-shaped ceiling in the central atrium, carpeting on some levels and a giant LED screen. The basement carpark has also been relocated to higher levels for more retail space. A pedestrian link to the Chinatown MRT station was also built. There is also a connecting bridge to Hong Lim Market & Food Center.

== Tenants ==
After the renovation works, a new tenant mix was also brought in including new anchor tenants, NTUC FairPrice, Daiso and Uniqlo. Other new tenants include an Eat At Taipei outlet, Din Tai Fung restaurant and also more apparel and other retail outlets.

A new 1,000 square metre library managed by National Library Board located on the fourth floor was also built. The library which focuses on Chinese culture and history is privately funded and is also Singapore's first public library to be staffed almost completely by volunteers.

== See also ==
- library@chinatown
- Chinatown MRT station
