= Clyde Terrace Market =

Market in Kampong Glam, Singapore

- The Clyde Terrace Market in 1963
- Interactive map of the Clyde Terrace Market area

General information
- Coordinates: 1.2985°N 103.8593°E
- Completed: 1874

Clyde Terrace Market (Chinese: 克莱台巴刹), also known as Beach Road Market (Chinese: 美芝路巴刹), Iron Market, Irumbu Pasar, Pasar Besi, Ti Pa-Sat, Thi Pa-Sat, Tick Pa Sat, Thick Pa Sat, Jit Pasah and Tie Basha (Chinese: 铁巴刹), was the largest market in Singapore. Initially a cluster of tiled sheds in Kampong Glam, a building was constructed in the 1870s to house the market. It was demolished in 1983 to make way for The Gateway.

== History ==
A photograph of the Clyde Terrace Market under construction

The market was initially a cluster of tiled sheds in Kampong Glam. According to Singapore Infopedia, published by the National Library Board of Singapore, although it is not known when the market came into existence, it was likely after Clyde Terrace, which first appeared on local records in 1863, was built. The market itself first appeared in local newspapers in 1870. An article in the 22 August 1871 edition of The Straits Times, then known as the Singapore Daily Times, described the market as a "standing reproach to the Settlement" and stated: "These sheds are not only disgraceful in their outward appearance, but their internal condition is anything but inviting, and it is next to impossible to keep them clean."

In 1871, following a reclamation project of the beach at the market, the government announced that it would spend $37,889 to build a new market to replace the cluster of sheds. The sheds were demolished and iron pillars and other building materials were imported from England in the following year. The foundation stone of the new market, a structure mostly made of iron, was laid on 29 March 1873. The opening ceremony was led by William Henry Macleod Read, with Sir Harry Ord, then the Governor of the Straits Settlements, in attendance. The iron structure eventually resulted in the market being nicknamed the "Iron Market". Variations included "pasar besi" in Malay, "irumbu pasar" in Tamil and "thih pa-sat" or "ti pa-sat" in Hokkien. The market began operations around 1874. In 1888, the market was expanded to include a vegetable section. This was followed several years after by the addition a fish market. A chicken market was also introduced to a market. However, by 1891, the fish market had fallen into a "bad state of repair." This, as well as the lack of space, led to the government deciding to reclaim land in order further expand the market. However, the reclamation project led to a subsidence in 1892 that resulted in a section of the market being demolished for being too unsafe. From February to September 1893, the market building was reconstructed. At the time, the government tendered out the exclusive right to lease stalls for markets in Singapore. The right to lease stalls at the Clyde Terrace Market was tendered out to a "farmer" for $16,968 in 1888 and $24,300 in 1889. The "farmer" system as a whole was abolished in 1910.

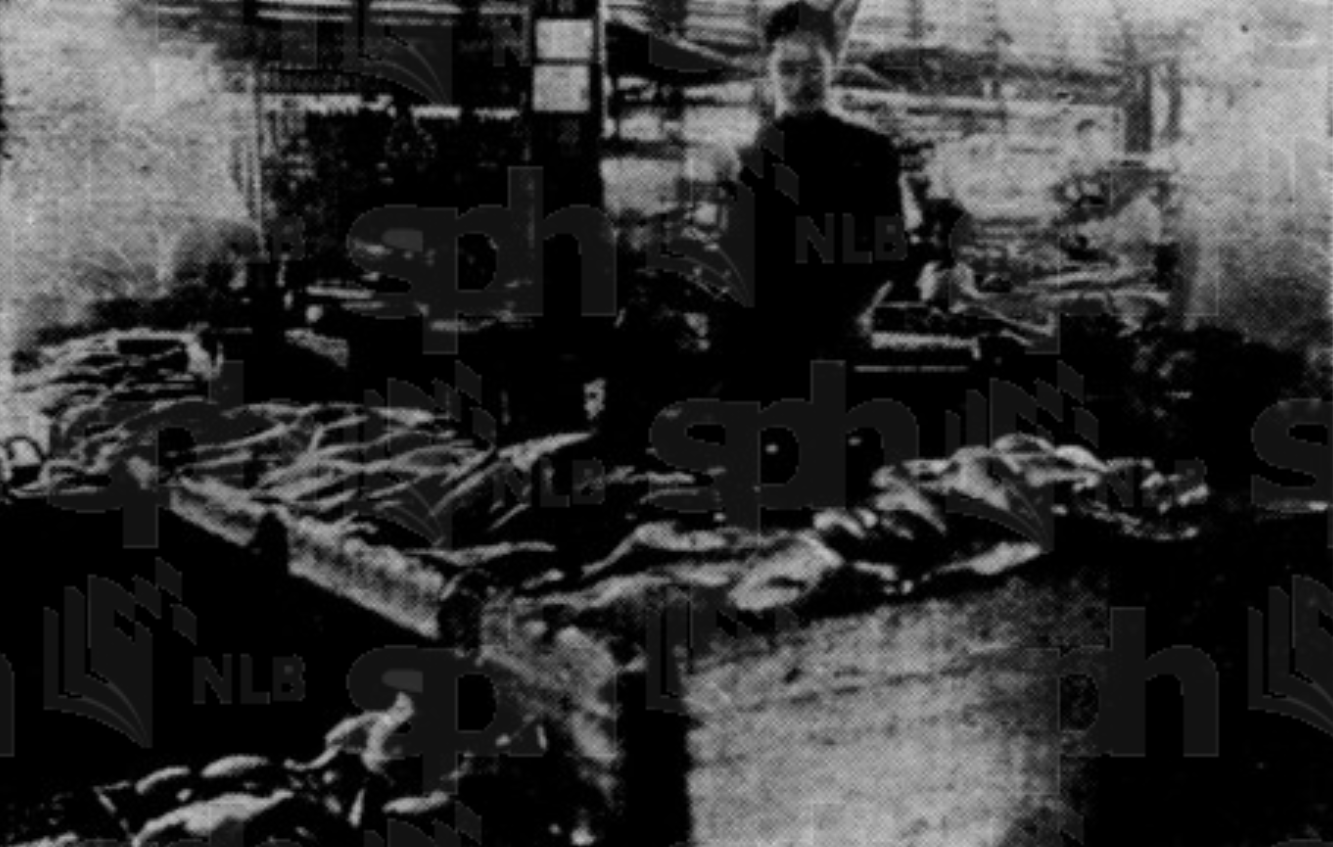
Fish being sold at the market in 1935

Prior to further land reclamations at the beach near the market, the section of the market facing the beach would flood at high tide, during which tongkangs would arrive to deliver goods. $2,010,212 worth of foodstuffs was reported to have been handled at the market in the year 1940, the largest out of any market in Singapore for that year, with over 12,000,000 catties of wet fish passing through the market. At the time, it was considered one of the five "principal markets" in Singapore, along with Ellenborough, Telok Ayer, Kandang Kerbau and the Orchard Road markets. In this period, the market's supply of fish mostly came from Chinese fishermen who covered the parts of the ocean near the Katong, Johor and Changi areas. During World War II, the basement of the market's vegetable section was used as a bomb shelter. However, as with most other wholesale markets in Singapore at the time, the Clyde Terrace Market suffered from the presence of secret societies. Secret society members would extort money from hawkers and engage in gambling opium smoking and smuggling. Rivalling societies would sometimes clash at the market. These clashes would occasionally result in fatalities. However, the situation had significantly improved by the time of the market's closure in 1983, largely due to increased police surveillance and the cooperation between the Vegetable Wholesaler's Association and the police.

In 1969, the Jurong Fishing Port and the Jurong Central Fish Market were built in order to replace the Telok Ayer Basin and the Ellenborough and Clyde Terrace markets. The chicken market was demolished in the following year to make way for a carpark at the Golden Mile Complex, while the fish market was demolished to make way for the construction of Nicoll Highway. In April 1974, the Urban Redevelopment Authority announced that the market would be demolished to make way for future developments, as it was "out of place", being surrounded by many high-rise buildings. Additionally, lorries delivering goods to the market would congest the nearby roads. Several of the market's stallholders moved to the newly-constructed North Bridge Road Market after being told to do so in the year prior. In February 1977, it was announced that the Pasir Panjang Wholesale Centre would be built to replace Clyde Terrace and other markets that were to be demolished to make way for newer developments. In 1981, the government announced that the market would be demolished to make way for The Gateway. All 120 remaining stallholders were offered alternative locations, with ten stallholders choosing to move to existing wet markets and the other 110 stallholders choosing to move into the new Pasir Panjang market. The market's last day of operations was on 30 June. The stallholders relocated by the end of June 1983, with the market being demolished shortly after.
