= Lau Pa Sat =

Historic building in Singapore used as a food centre

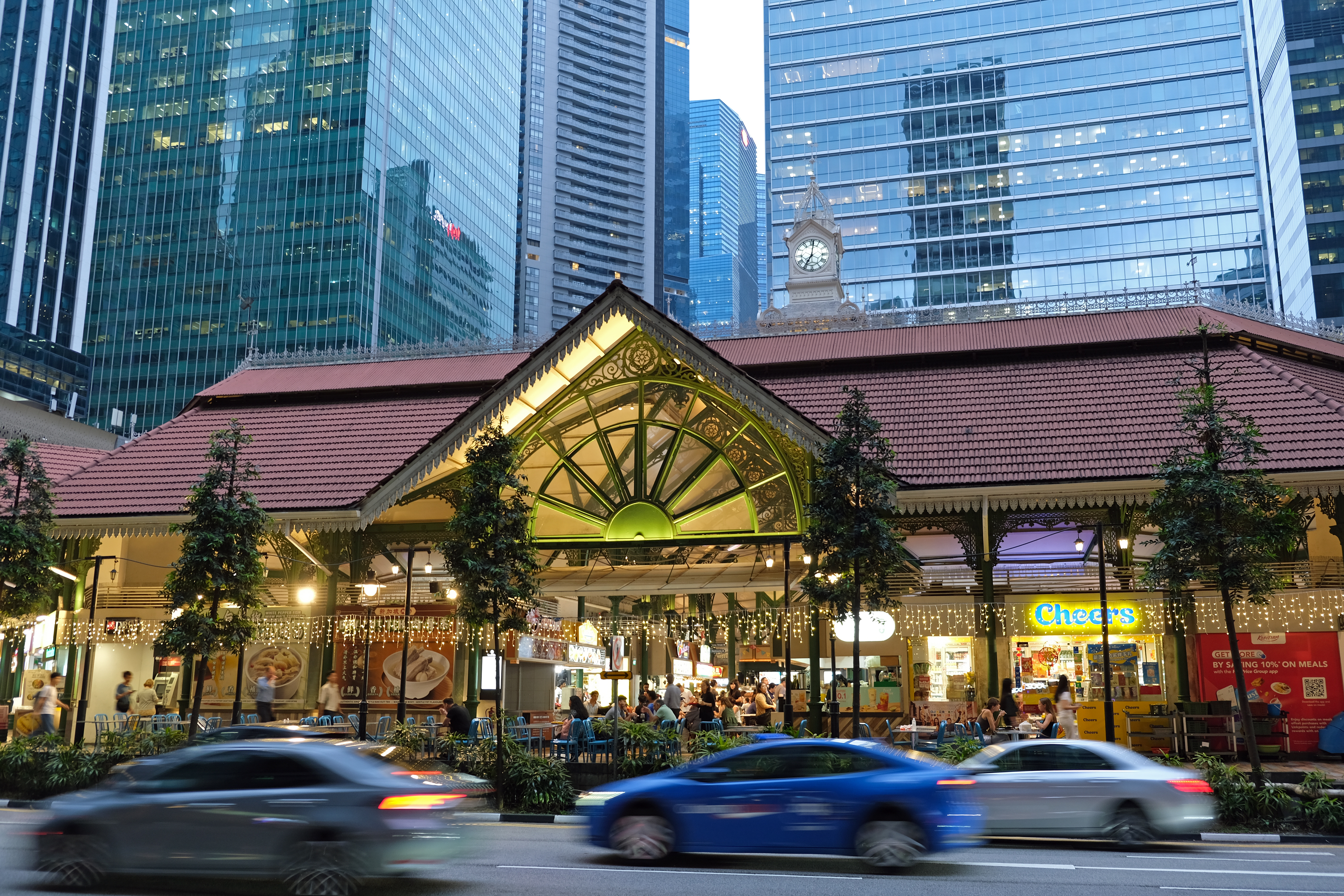

- Location within Singapore
- Interactive map of Lau Pa Sat
- 1°16′50″N 103°51′01″E
- Location: 18 Raffles Quay, Singapore 048582

History
- Built: 1 March 1894; 132 years ago

Site notes
- Governing body: National Heritage Board
- Website: https://laupasat.sg/

National monument of Singapore
- Designated: 28 June 1973; 53 years ago
- Reference no.: 4

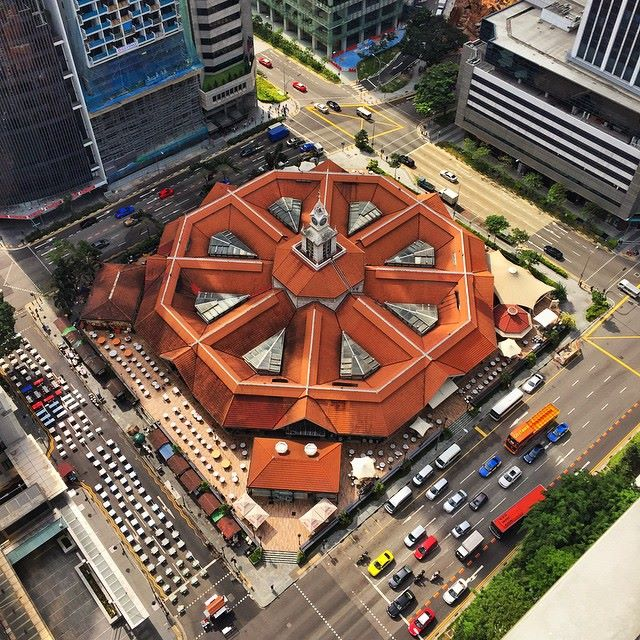
Lau Pa Sat from above

Lau Pa Sat (Chinese: 老巴刹; Pe̍h-ōe-jī: Lāu Pa-sat; pinyin: Lǎo Bāshā; lit. 'Old Market'), also known as Telok Ayer Market (Malay: Pasar Telok Ayer; Chinese: 直落亚逸巴刹; Tamil: தெலோக் ஆயர் சந்தை), is a historic building located within the Downtown Core in the Central Area of Singapore. It was first built in 1824 as a fish market on the waterfront serving the people of early colonial Singapore and rebuilt in 1838. It was then relocated and rebuilt at the present location in 1894. It is currently a hawker centre with stalls selling a variety of local cuisine.

The market remains one of the oldest Victorian structures in South-East Asia and one of the first structures built in pre-fabricated cast iron in Asia. It is also the only remaining market left that served the residents in the central district of early Singapore.

== Etymology ==
Telok Ayer Market (Malay: Pasar Telok Ayer; Chinese: 直落亚逸巴刹; Tamil: தெலோக் ஆயர் சந்தை) is named after Telok Ayer Bay. In the early nineteenth century, the market was a simple wooden building located on piles just over the waters of Telok Ayer Bay before land reclamation work filled in the bay. The Malay name Telok Ayer means "bay water", and the then coastal road Telok Ayer Street was located alongside the bay before land reclamation work started in 1879.

Lau Pa Sat (Chinese: 老巴刹; Pe̍h-ōe-jī: Lāu Pa-sat; pinyin: Lǎo Bāshā) means "old market" in the vernacular Hokkien Chinese of Singapore. "Lau" means old; "Pa Sat" is the Hokkien pronunciation of the Persian loanword "bazaar" (market) which is pasar in Malay. The original Telok Ayer market was one of the oldest markets in Singapore; a new market called Ellenborough Market was later built along Ellenborough Street (now the site of The Central shopping mall, next to Tew Chew Street), and that market became known to the locals as the "new market" (Pasar Baru or Sin Pa Sat, Ellenborough Street was known as Sin Pa Sat Kham meaning "the mouth of the new market"), while the Telok Ayer Market in turn became known colloquially as the "old market" or Lau Pa Sat. Because of its Victorian iron structure, the market is also referred to in Malay as pasar besi (market of iron).

== History ==
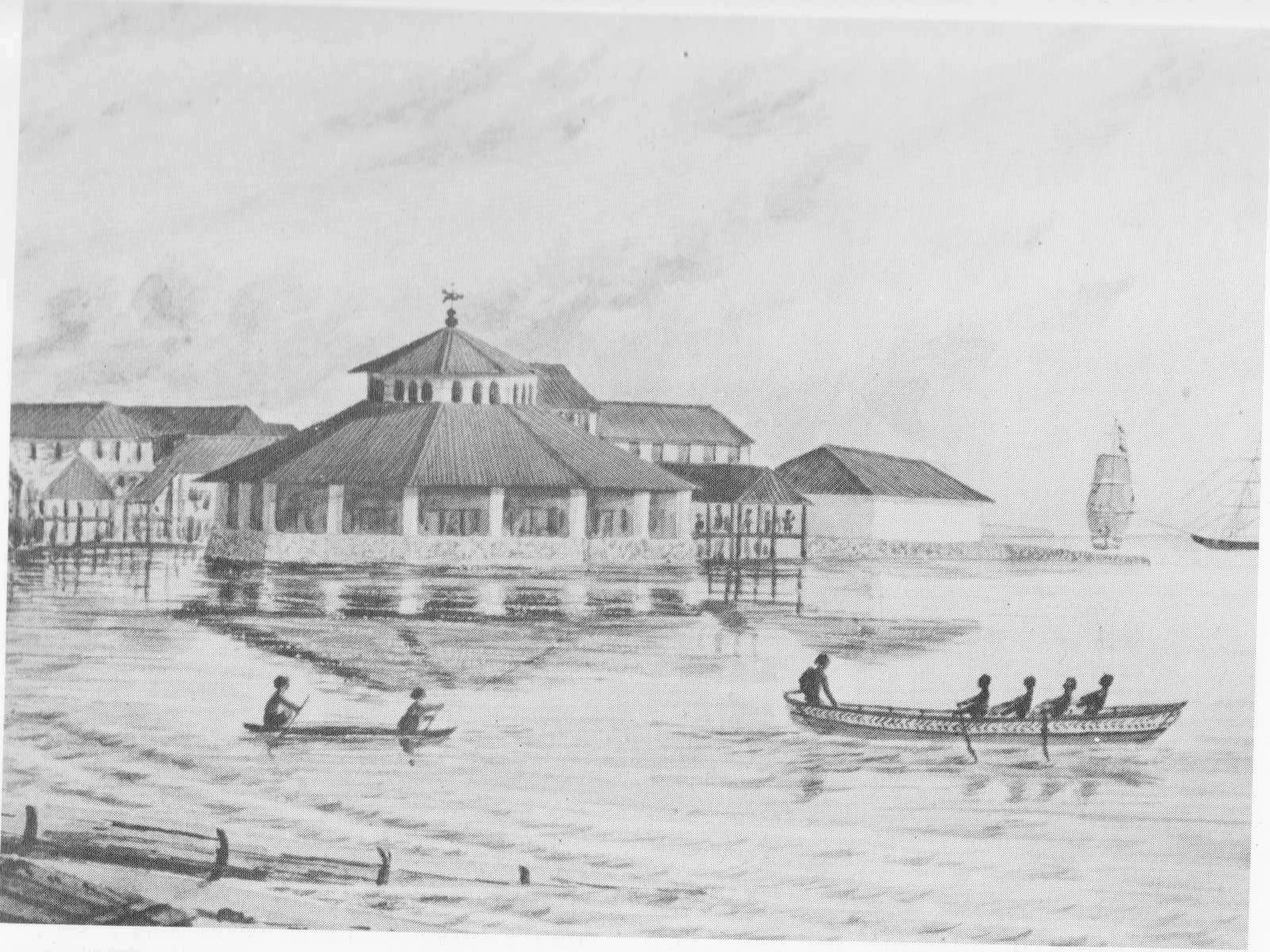
The old Telok Ayer Market at the seaside as designed by George Drumgoole Coleman at Telok Ayer Bay. Details of an 1847 painting by John Turnbull Thomson. The fish market extension is visible behind the main market.

The first market built in Singapore, a fish market, was located on the south bank of the Singapore River near the north end of the Market Street. On 4 November 1822, as part of his general plan to remodel the town, Stamford Raffles issued an instruction to relocate the fish market, which was then moved to Telok Ayer.

The construction of the Telok Ayer Market started in 1823 under the supervision of police officer Francis James Bernard at a site on the southern end of Market Street on Telok Ayer Bay. The market, a timber-and-atap structure, opened in 1824. It was built on the shore with part of its structure extended out to the sea, so waste from the market may be washed away by the tides and produce can be loaded or unloaded directly from boats via jetties. However, the building was not well-constructed – the timber piles on which the building was placed were not sturdy enough, and needed to be replaced soon after completion. Its atap roof also did not comply with building regulations and was therefore replaced with tiles. However, the structure was not strong enough to support a tile roof and was in danger of collapse, and it had to be replaced with atap again in 1827 regardless of fire regulation. The building was repeatedly repaired but by 1830, the structure was judged to be in an "extremely unsafe state" and needed to be rebuilt. A temporary market was erected in 1832 while a newer building awaited construction.

The construction of a new market, designed by architect George Drumgoole Coleman, commenced on the same site in 1836 and it was completed in 1838. Coleman produced an octagonal building with ornamental columns at the entrance. The building had twice the area of the older market, and was formed of an outer and inner drum, with the colonnade of the outer drum letting in light but also providing shelter from the sun and rain. This building was built on two octagonal rings of brick piers, which supported a structure 125 feet (38 m) in diameter, and an inner drum 40 feet (12 m) in diameter. As with the previous structure, it suffered from its exposure to the monsoons and the sea, and soon after its construction, concerns over its safety were voiced, and the market needed to be repaired. In 1841, the market was extended on one side of the main building under the supervision of contractor Denis McSwiney with the erection of a new fish market. This new structure was a long open shed, and it was later further extended to run roughly parallel to two sides of the octagonal market. The extension would help protect the main market by serving as a breakwater to reduce the force of the swells and surf from the east. Despite concerns over its safety for many years, it stood for over 40 years until it was demolished when land was reclaimed on Telok Ayer Bay. The prominence of the market on the waterfront made the building a landmark of early Singapore.

=== Relocation ===
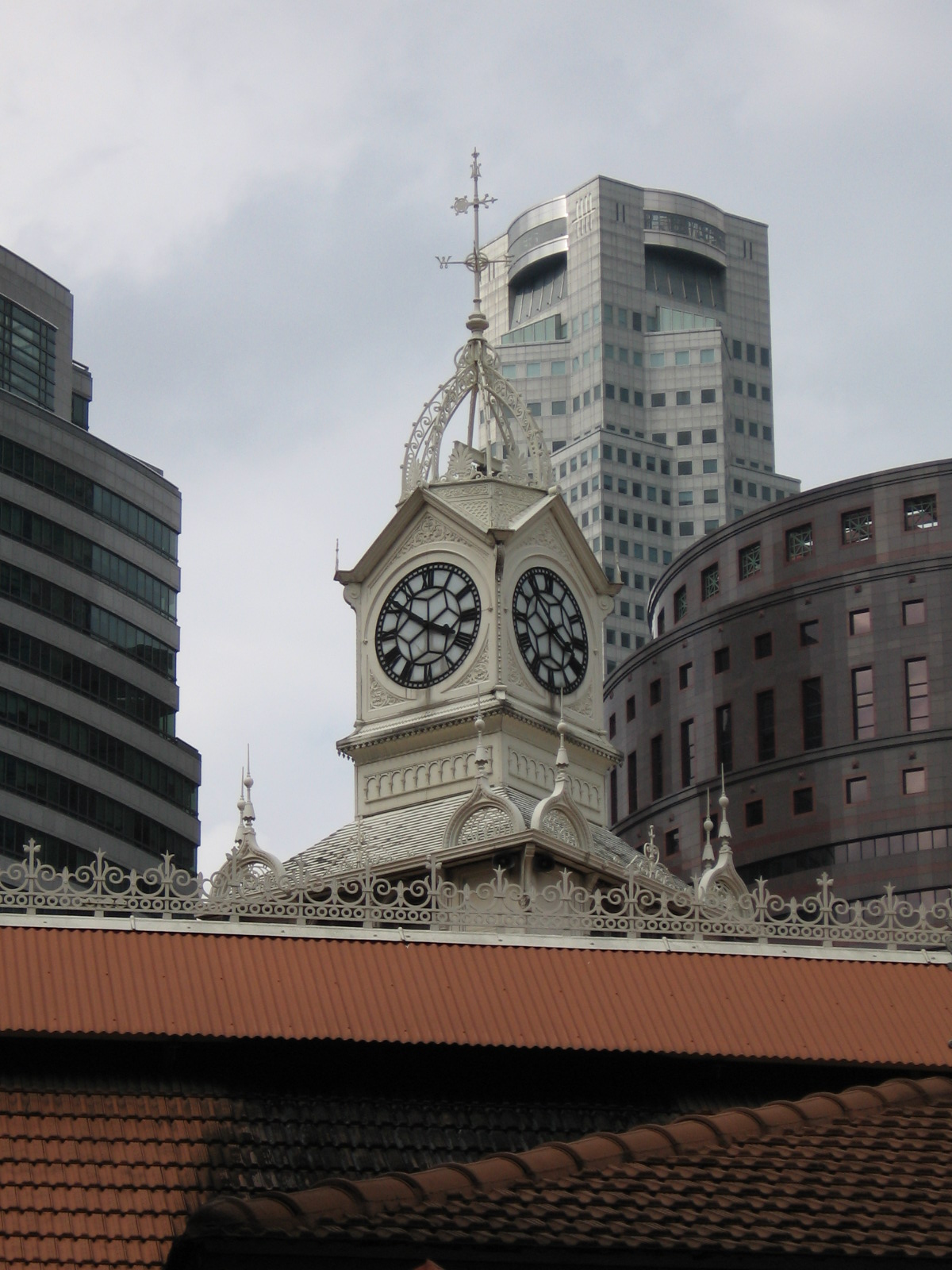
The distinctive clock tower of Telok Ayer Market, incorporating the chiming clock installed in 1991

In 1879, land reclamation work on Telok Ayer Bay to create the land on which Robinson Road is now located began. The newly reclaimed land, on which the current market now sits, was declared to be ready for use in 1890, and construction of a new market was initiated. The market was certified as completed on 1 March 1894, and Market Street was extended to the new location. The new building, which covers an area of 55,000 square feet (5,100 m^{2}), was designed by the Municipal Engineer James MacRitchie (who also designed the MacRitchie Reservoir). MacRitchie adopted the octagonal shape of Coleman's original design, and used cast-iron pillars to support the building. The cast-iron work cost £13,200, and was shipped out from Glasgow by P&W MacLellan, who had also supplied the iron for the Cavenagh Bridge in 1868. The great cast-iron columns which support the structure bear the maker's mark of W. MacFarlane and Co., also of Glasgow. The iron structure was erected by Riley Hargreaves & Co. (now United Engineers) at a cost of $14,900, while building contractor Chea Keow laid the foundation for $18,000. This building, which is the current one still standing, was placed close to the waterfront and served as a general market, but linked by a bridge to a fish market built over the sea. However, further land reclamations in the 20th century meant that the octagonal building is now some distance from the shoreline.

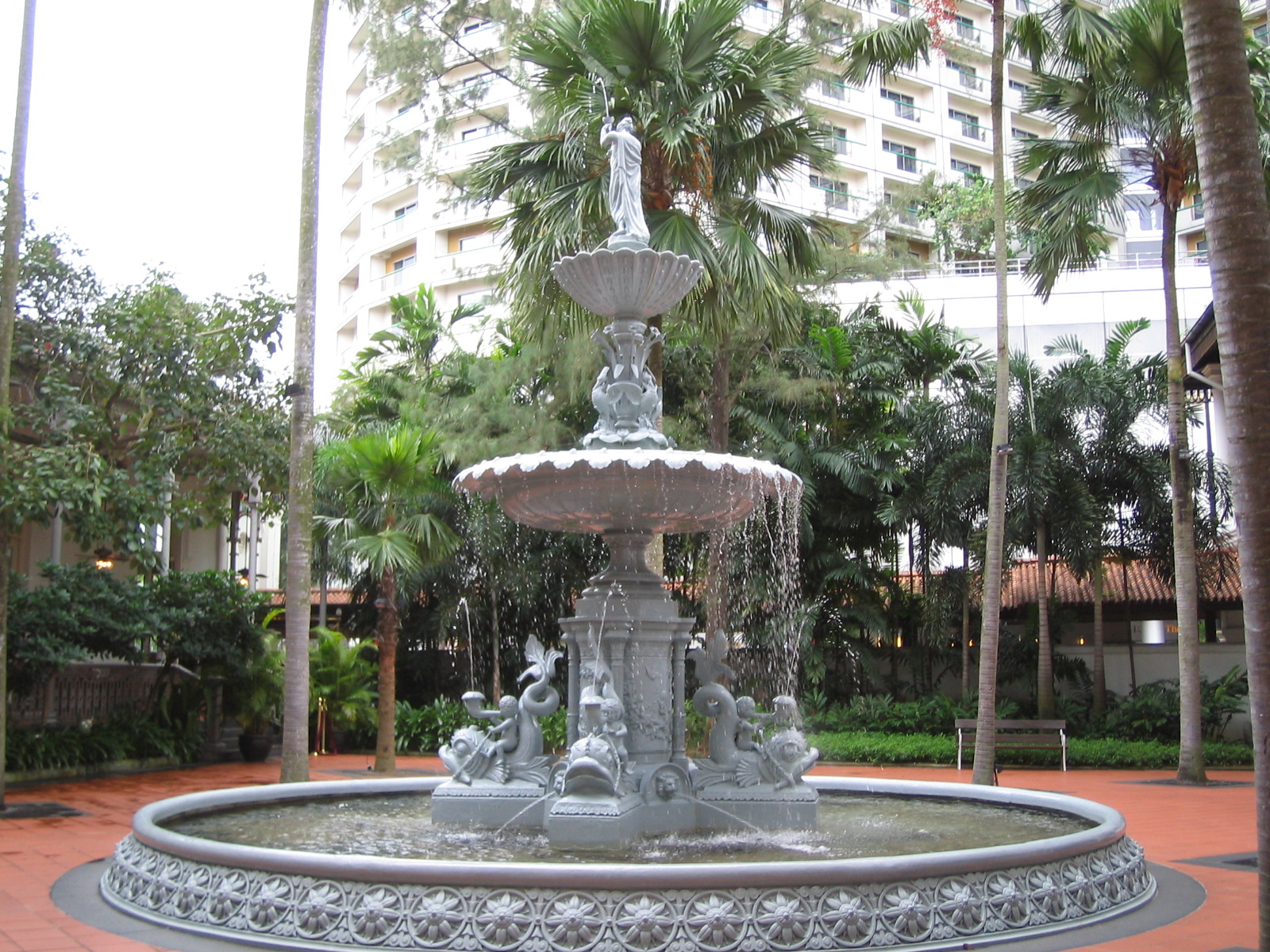
This fountain was originally placed at the center of the Telok Ayer Market. It was later moved to the Orchard Road Market, and is now located in the Raffles Hotel.

A cast-iron fountain was originally placed at the centre of the market under the clock tower, but in 1902 the fountain was moved to the front of the now demolished Orchard Road Market. The fountain was moved again in 1930 to the Grand Hotel in Katong, and later dismantled and forgotten. It was rediscovered in pieces in 1989 by a team responsible for the restoration works for Raffles Hotel. The fountain has since been reassembled and restored, and now forms the centrepiece of the Palm Garden at the Raffles Hotel.

=== As hawker centre ===
By the early 1970s, the area around Telok Ayer Market—Shenton Way, Robinson Road, Cecil Street and Raffles Place—had transformed into a major commercial and financial district of Singapore, and a wet market was no longer considered suitable for the area. In 1972, the market was converted into a hawker centre. However, the historical and architectural value of Telok Ayer Marker was recognised, and it was gazetted as a national monument on 28 June 1973.

In 1986, the market was closed to allow construction of a new Mass Rapid Transit (MRT) line which runs underneath the building. The building was taken apart and its cast-iron supports put into storage in Jurong. Once the track-laying project was finished, the Telok Ayer Market was reconstructed in the late 1980s.

In 1989, the market was officially renamed Lau Pa Sat, the vernacular name most Singaporeans used to refer to the market. The old market reopened in 1991 as a festival market, a modern food court and entertainment centre catering to office workers and tourists.

A major renovation of Lau Pa Sat, costing $4 million and lasting 9 months, began on 1 September 2013. The layout of the stalls was reconfigured in the renovation, reducing the number of stalls but increasing the seating. Better cooling and ventilation was obtained with eight high volume low speed ceiling fans. It reopened on 30 June 2014.

The market is the only remaining one left that served the resident in the central district in early Singapore. The other four being the Orchard Road Market, Rochor Market, Clyde Terrace Market popularly known as Beach Road, demolished in 1983 to make way for now currently The Gateway and Ellenborough Market, nicknamed Teochew Market where the surrounding area was populated by Teochews, near the New Bridge Road.

Lau Pa Sat underwent a minor renovation in 2020. In November 2020, part of Lau Pa Sat opened partially for a new food hall – Food Folks sized around 7,000 square feet (650 m^{2}) – Singapore's first locally focused F&B and retail blended space. The rest of Lau Pa Sat reopened in 2021.

== Architecture ==
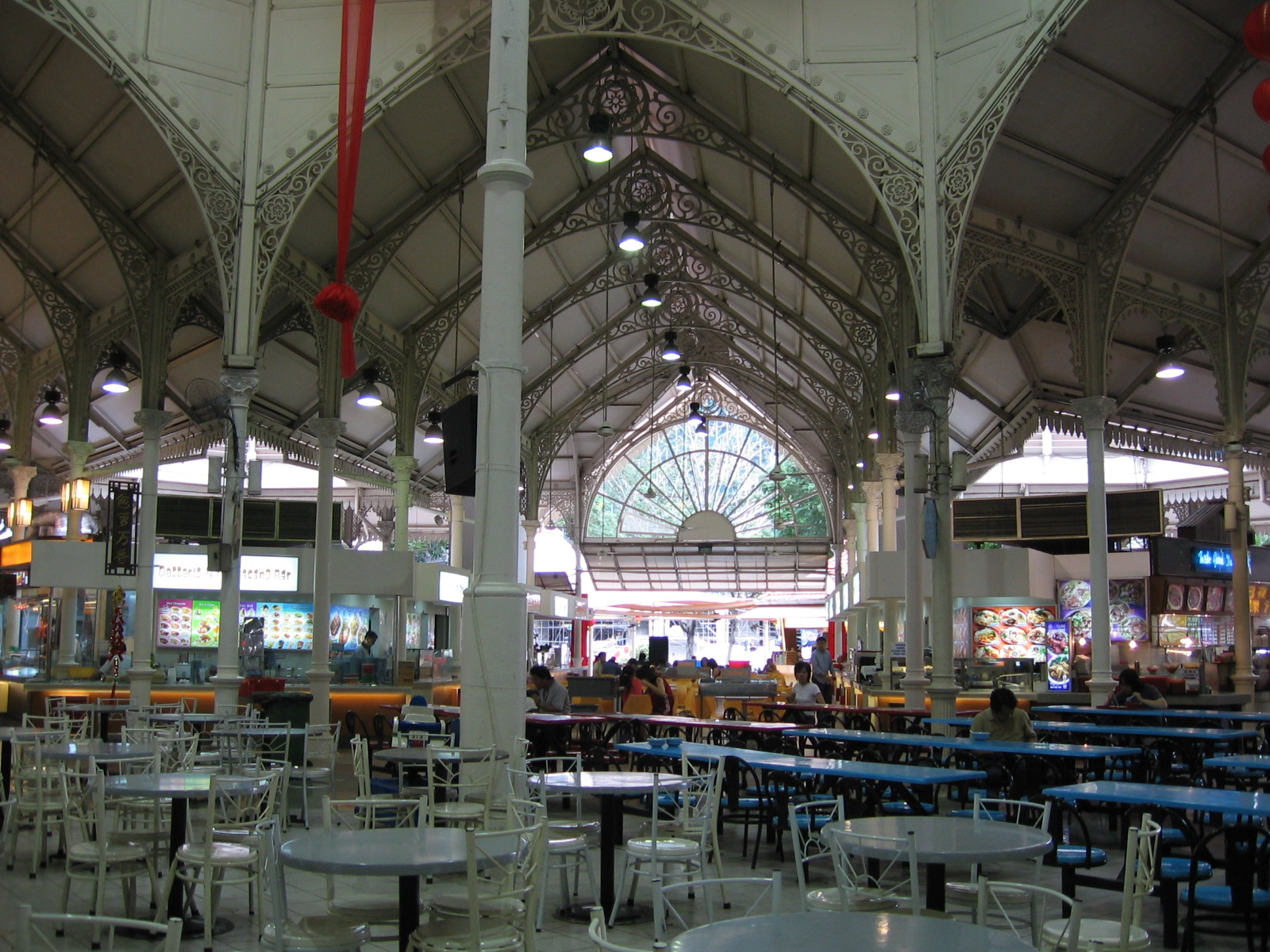
The intricate roof and column structures of the Lau Pa Sat are typically Victorian.

Lau Pa Sat's octagonal, cast-iron structure was designed by James MacRitchie, who adopted George Drumgoole Coleman's original octagonal shape for the older market. The cast-iron structures were crafted by Walter MacFarlane & Company, an iron foundry in Glasgow, Scotland. These were then shipped over to Singapore, and assembled on its current location by Riley Hargreaves & Co.

A lantern is placed at the center, allowing daylight to illuminate the interior. The lantern is topped by a clock tower installed in 1991, and there is a set of a Carillon producing Chinese, Malay and Indian melodies. The 23 Dutch bronze bells are struck by a jacquemart (figure of a bell striker) dress like a coolie.

== Images ==
The photographs of the renovated Lau Pa Sat are below.

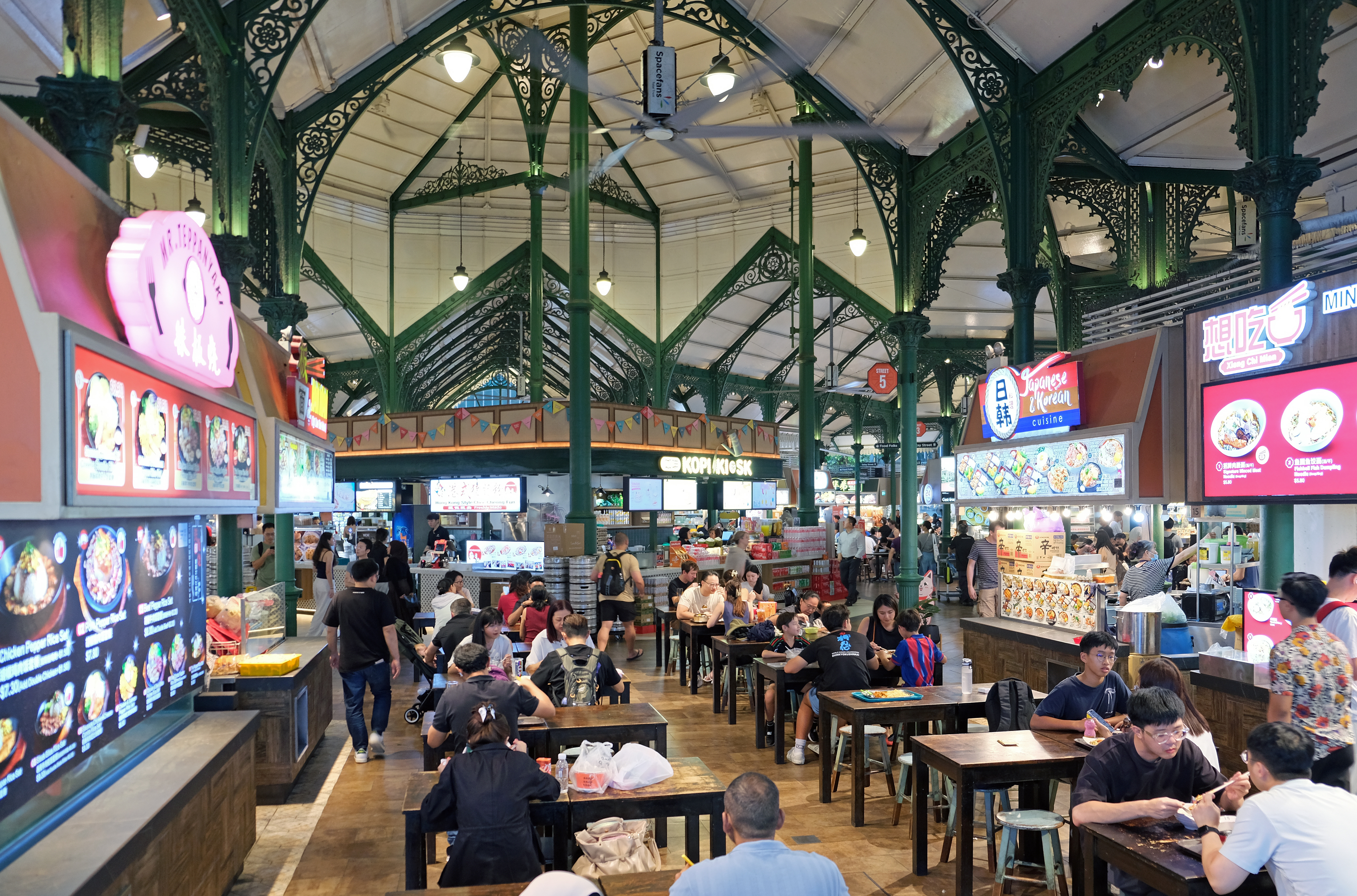
Interior view

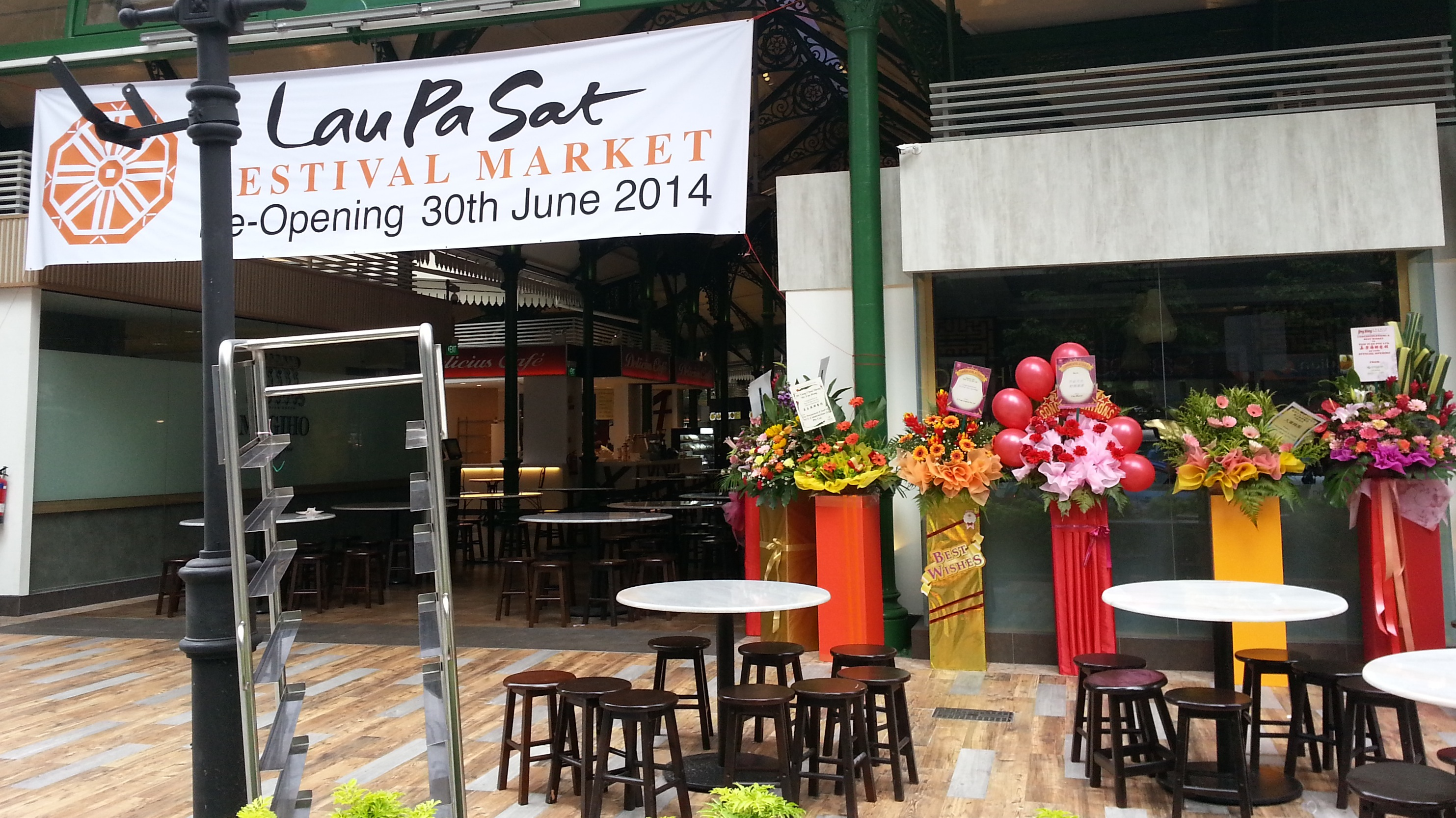
Re-opening of the food court after renovation

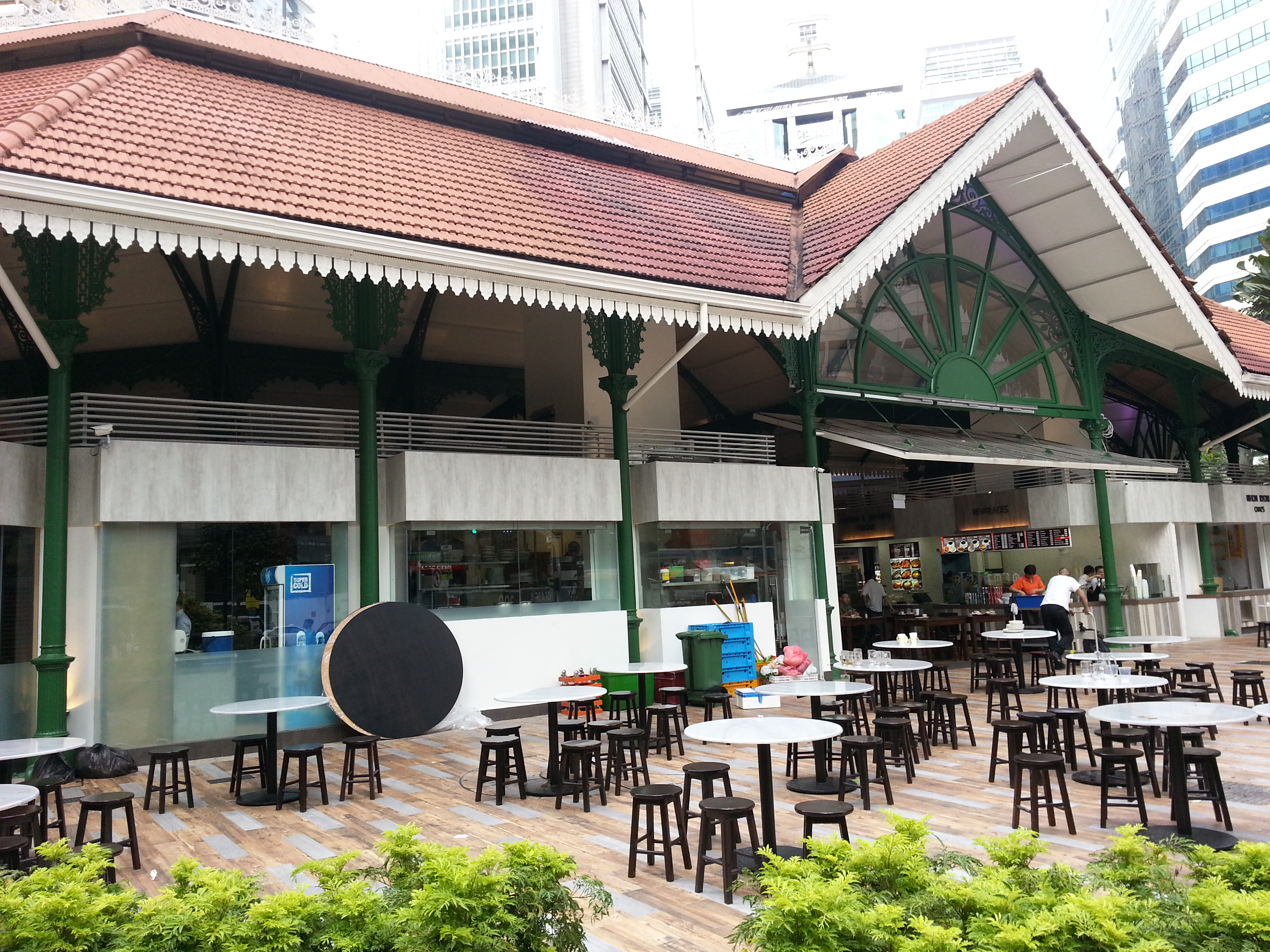
Seatings outside

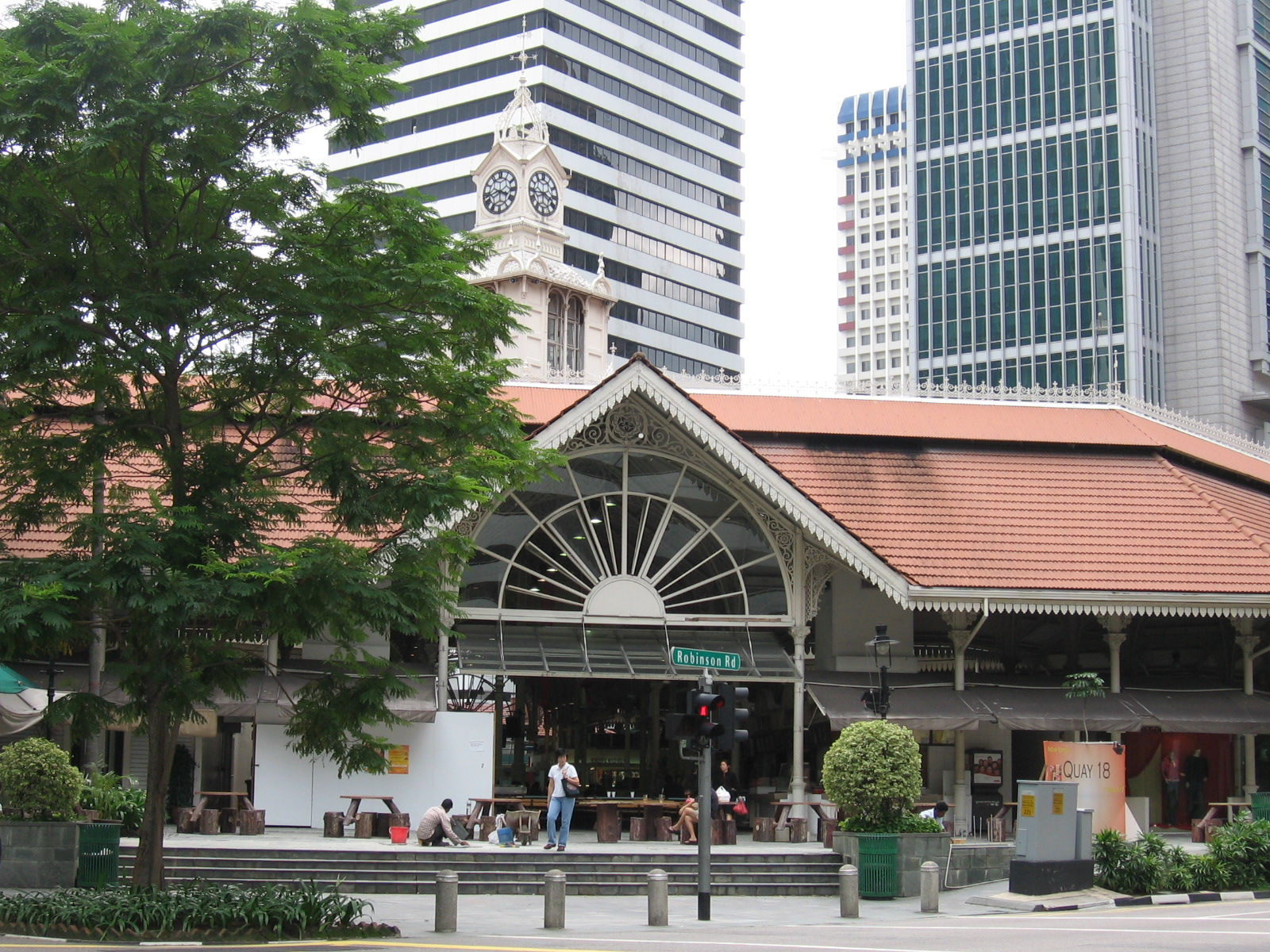
Entrance to Lau Pa Sat

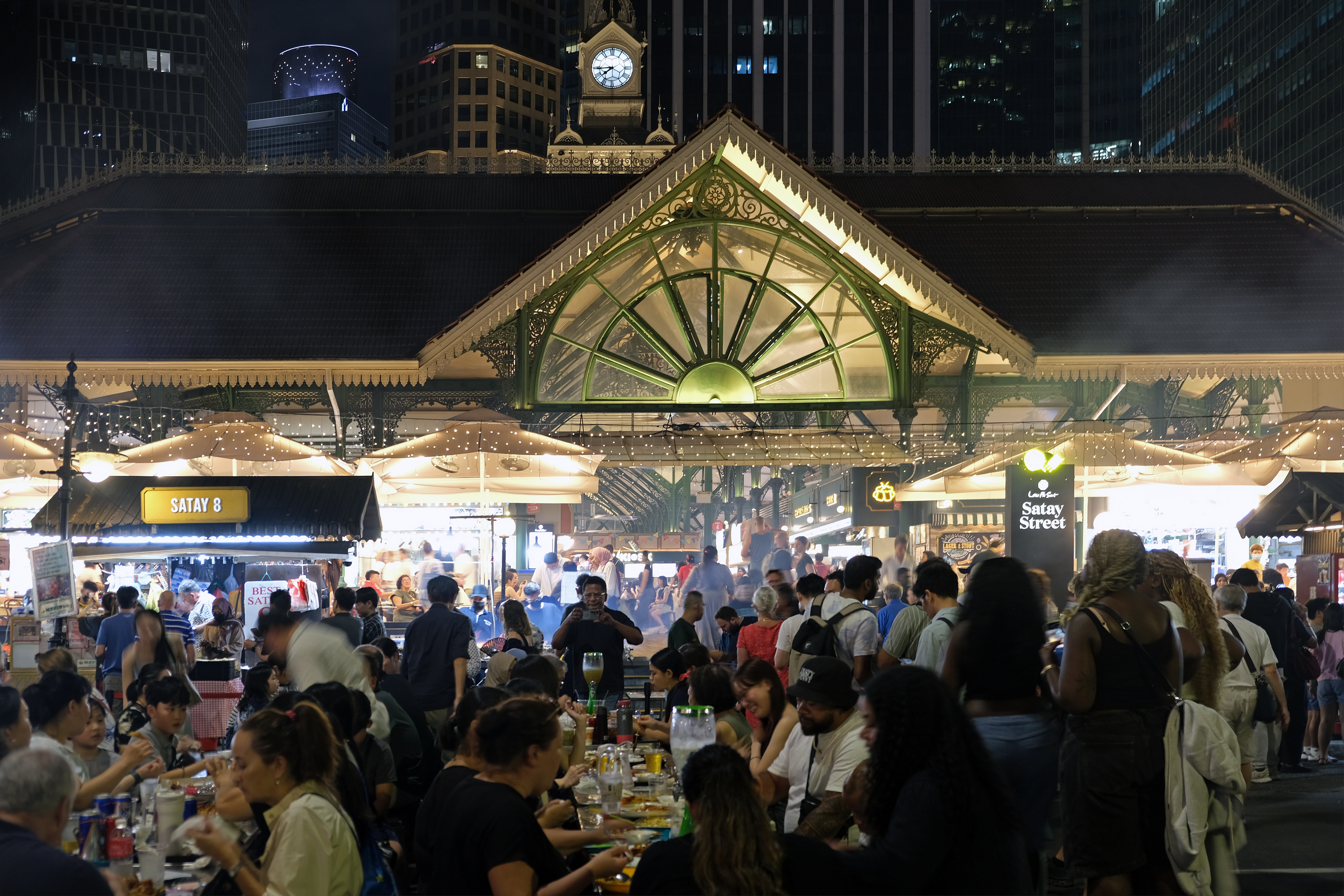
Satay Street on Boon Tat Street, Singapore's largest open-air Satay Street
