= EPaper Ltd =

ePaper Ltd.
- Type: Private Limited
- Industry: Print management software
- Headquarters: Israel
- Area served: Worldwide
- Key people: Belal Lehwany (CEO)
- Products: Sentinel, SaveToner print optimization technology

ePaper Ltd. is an Israeli company known for its developing and manufacturing of Sentinel, a print management software. The company is also known for its print optimization technology, SaveToner.

== History ==
The company has been operating for over a decade developing the cross platform software, Sentinel. Belal Lehwany, of Israel Arab sector, founded the company which is headquartered at Israel and operates additionally from Europe, USA and India. The software is, however, distributed worldwide.

The software and its external as well as embedded controllers are designed to work with any printing device, scanner or MFP universally. The company is focused on print related activities including data collection, user & device management and monitoring, data leak prevention, resource mapping, application of rules for secure pull printing, intra-organization connectivity between systems and sites.
