= CQY =

CQY can refer to:

- Clarke Quay MRT station, a train station in Singapore
- Circular Quay railway station, a train station in Sydney, New South Wales, Australia
