= Y Soft =

Company based in Brno, Czech Republic

Y Soft Corporation
- Industry: Software and Electronics Hardware
- Founded: 2000
- Headquarters: Brno, Czech Republic
- Area served: Worldwide
- Key people: CEO and Co-Founder: Václav Muchna and CIO and Co-Founder: Martin de Martini
- Products: YSoft SAFEQ Enterprise Workflow Platform (SAFEQ 6), YSoft SAFEQ Cloud Platform (SAFEQ Cloud Breeze and Pro), YSoft OMNI Bridge, YSoft Clerbo, and YSoft AIVA
- Revenue: 63,933,900 Czech koruna (2018)
- Operating income: 2,436,900 Czech koruna (2018)
- Net income: ▼CZK -97 mio. (2023)
- Total assets: 108,360,000 Czech koruna (2018)
- Total equity: ▼CZK -165 mio. (2023)
- Number of employees: ▼287 (2024/25)
- Website: www.ysoft.com

Y Soft Corporation is a multinational software and electronic hardware company founded in 2000, which operates in 21 countries. The company's headquarters are in Brno, Czech Republic, with offices in France, Denmark, Israel, United Kingdom, United Arab Emirates, United States, Japan, Singapore, Australia, and China.

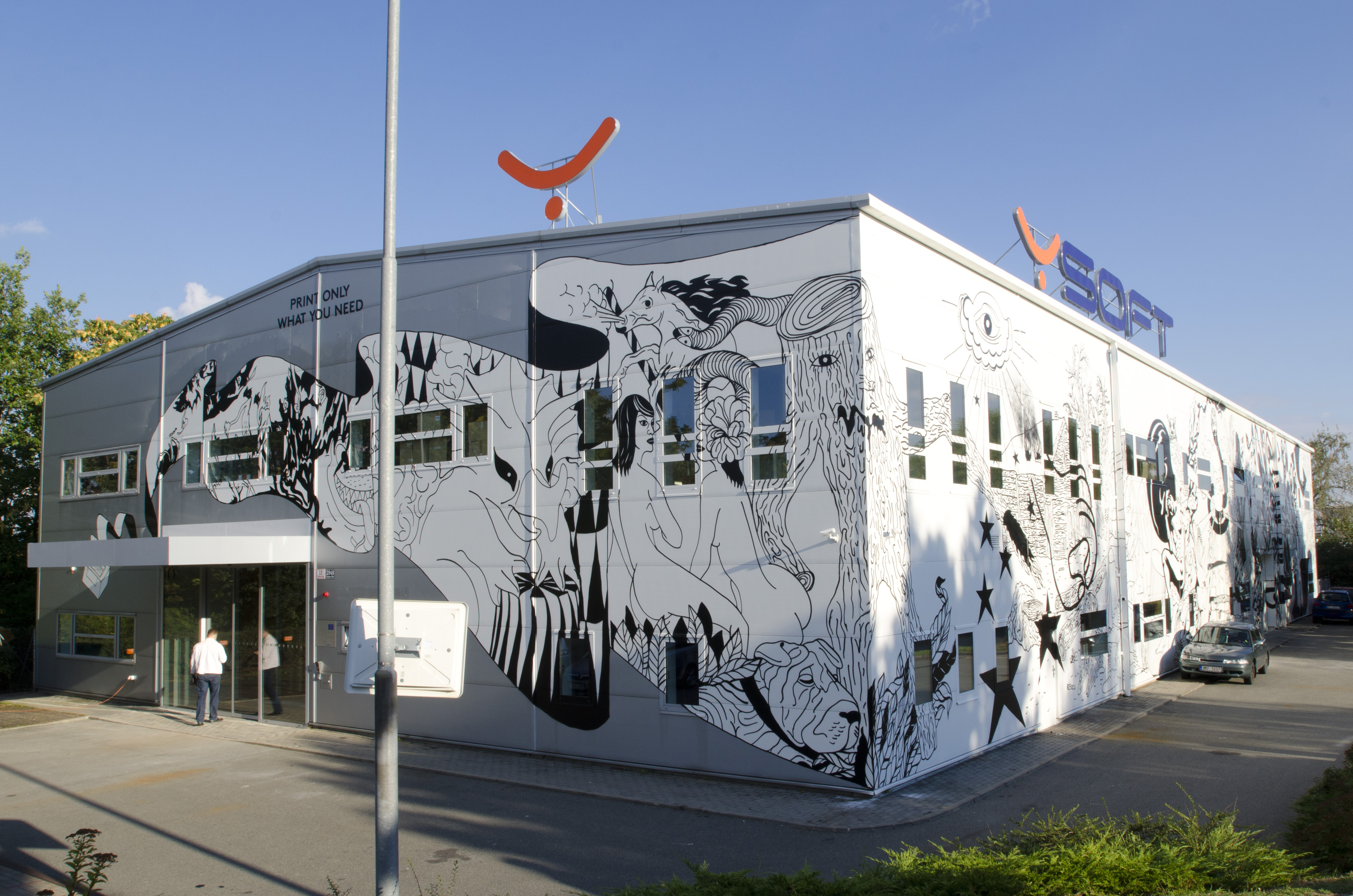
In 2012, the Y Soft headquarters building facade in Brno, Czech Republic, became a Y Soft Wall Gallery allowing the young local artists to present their work in a non-conventional way. Credit: Y Soft

Y Soft Ventures, the company's in-house venture arm, was established in 2014 as a way for the two co-founders to support other Central European entrepreneurs looking to start their own companies with business and financial support.

== Products ==
The company's core product is:

- The YSoft SAFEQ platform, which manages on-premises and hybrid 2D and 3D printing and document capture, including pull printing, paper copying, faxing, scan workflows, cloud printing, and other tasks.
- The platform also comes as a Native cloud platform (SAFEQ Cloud Breeze and SAFEQ Cloud Pro), which enables various cloud printing capabilities in cloud or hybrid infrastructures.
- European manufactured hardware applications, including MFX and MFX4 card readers, OMNI Bridge gateway, and print terminals.

== History ==
Y Soft was co-founded in 2000 by Václav Muchna, CEO and chairman of the board, and Martin de Martini, chief information officer and board member, as part of a student project with Masaryk University in Brno, Czech Republic. Muchna left university and started Y Soft a month after his 20th birthday.

Y Soft's first expansion was the opening of an office in Hungary. In 2008, Y Soft acquired XpertImage, resulting in the establishment of Y Soft North America in Grapevine, Texas, and new offices in Japan and Israel.

In 2012, Y Soft filed and received a US patent for a "System for scalable processing of files in the cloud". The following year, the company expanded into Australia with the acquisition of Equitrac Systems, and also established an office in Dubai.

In 2014, Y Soft created an in-house venture capital fund, Y Soft Ventures, to invest in Central European startups.

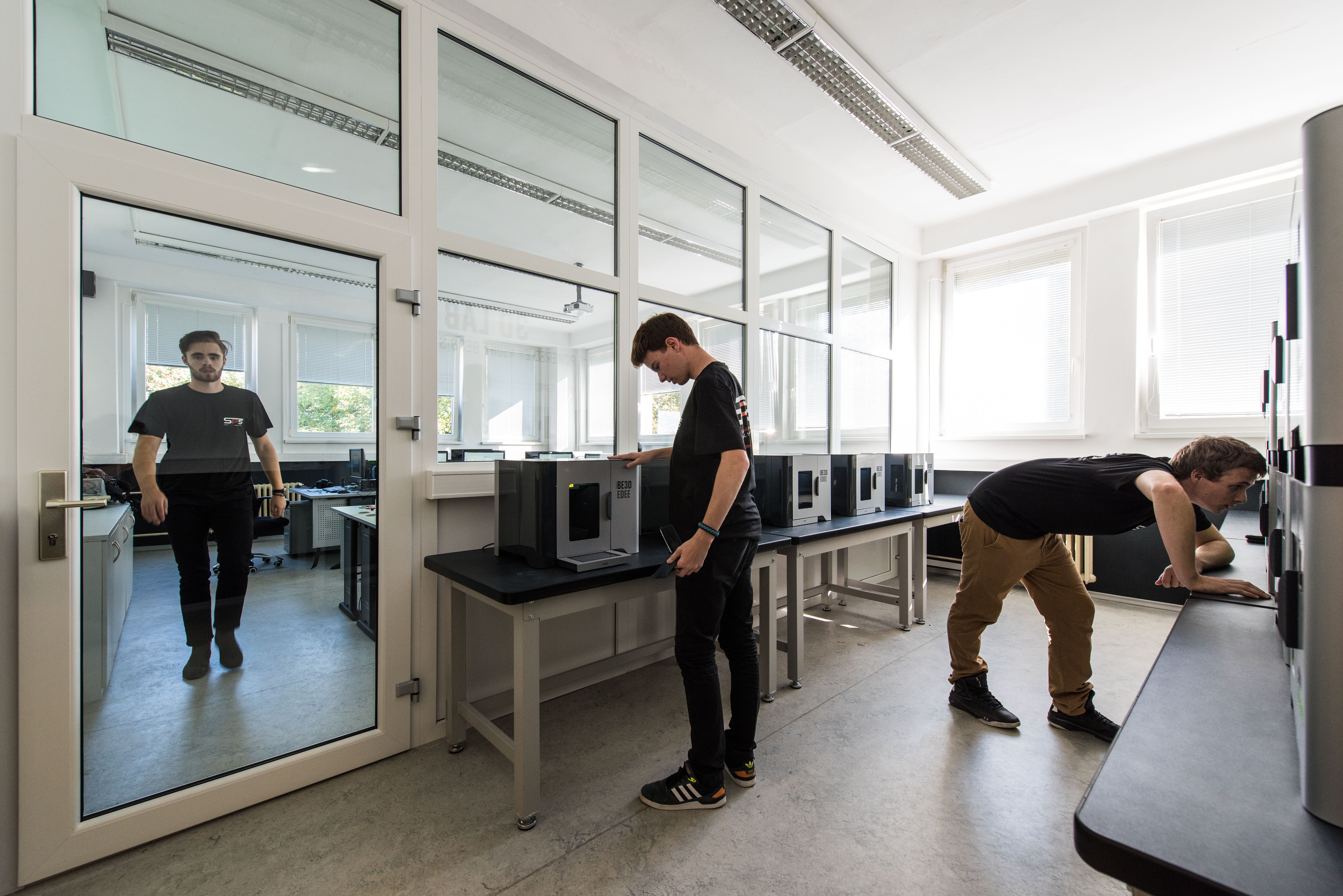
Students at Technical School Prosek in the Czech Republic use YSoft be3D eDee printers at their school. Credit: Y Soft, 2016

In late 2014, Y Soft invested a stake in, and later fully acquired, the Czech 3D printer company BE3D. Soon after, YSoft SAFEQ was integrated with the be3D printers to create a new product, YSoft BE3D eDee, a 3D printer integrated with YSoft SAFEQ providing print management, workflow and an accounting system. In 2015, Y Soft started offering print management and document capture as software as a service (SaaS) by subscription.

In 2016, the company established YSoft Labs, an internal innovation center focusing on artificial intelligence, robotics, business processes and future developments in 3D printing. In July 2016 the YSoft SAFEQ version 6 was introduced as a platform. This year, Y Soft joined the Mopria Alliance. In 2017 YSoft SAFEQ became the de facto Mopria certified enterprise print server for printing from Android mobile apps. The company also opened offices in the UK.

In 2016, Y Soft released Clerbo, an application serving as a document management system and a process tool. The product evolved into an employee lifecycle tool and Learning Experience Platform (LXP) for pre- and onboarding, learning and development, and offboarding.

In 2017, Y Soft opened an office in China, and moved its manufacturing facility to larger premises.

In 2019, Y Soft launched BE3D Academy, part of its YSoft BE3D eDee 3D printing education platform, containing resources related to 3D printing for use by teachers.

Since 2020, Y Soft has been on the board of the United States Chamber of Commerce in the Czech Republic. A representative of the company was a board member between 2020 and 2022 and vice president from 2022.

In 2022, Y Soft launched AIVA, developed by YSoft Labs as a system for automated testing of physical touchscreen devices, using a robotic arm and camera together with computer vision and machine learning.

In 2022, Y Soft acquired the Danish cloud print company EveryonePrint, procuring a new office in Copenhagen. Using software acquired from EveryonePrint, Y Soft launched two subscription-based cloud print services, SAFEQ Cloud and SAFEQ Managed. Following the acquisition, former EveryonePrint CEO Tavs Dalaa became the new Chief Technology Officer of Y Soft.

In 2025, Y Soft relaunched SAFEQ Cloud as a product family, with SAFEQ Cloud Breeze designed for cloud environments and SAFEQ Cloud Pro for hybrid environments. A month later, the company launched a new generation of card readers: MFX4 Reader, MFX4 Mobile, MFX4 Lite, and MFX4 Ultimate.

In 2026, as part of a shift away from the original hardware-based approach, Y Soft launched AIVA as a public cloud service for automated testing of web applications, retaining the original approach of evaluating the user interface visually rather than by inspecting the underlying code.
