= The Gateway (Singapore) =

Office skyscraper in Singapore

- 新门广场
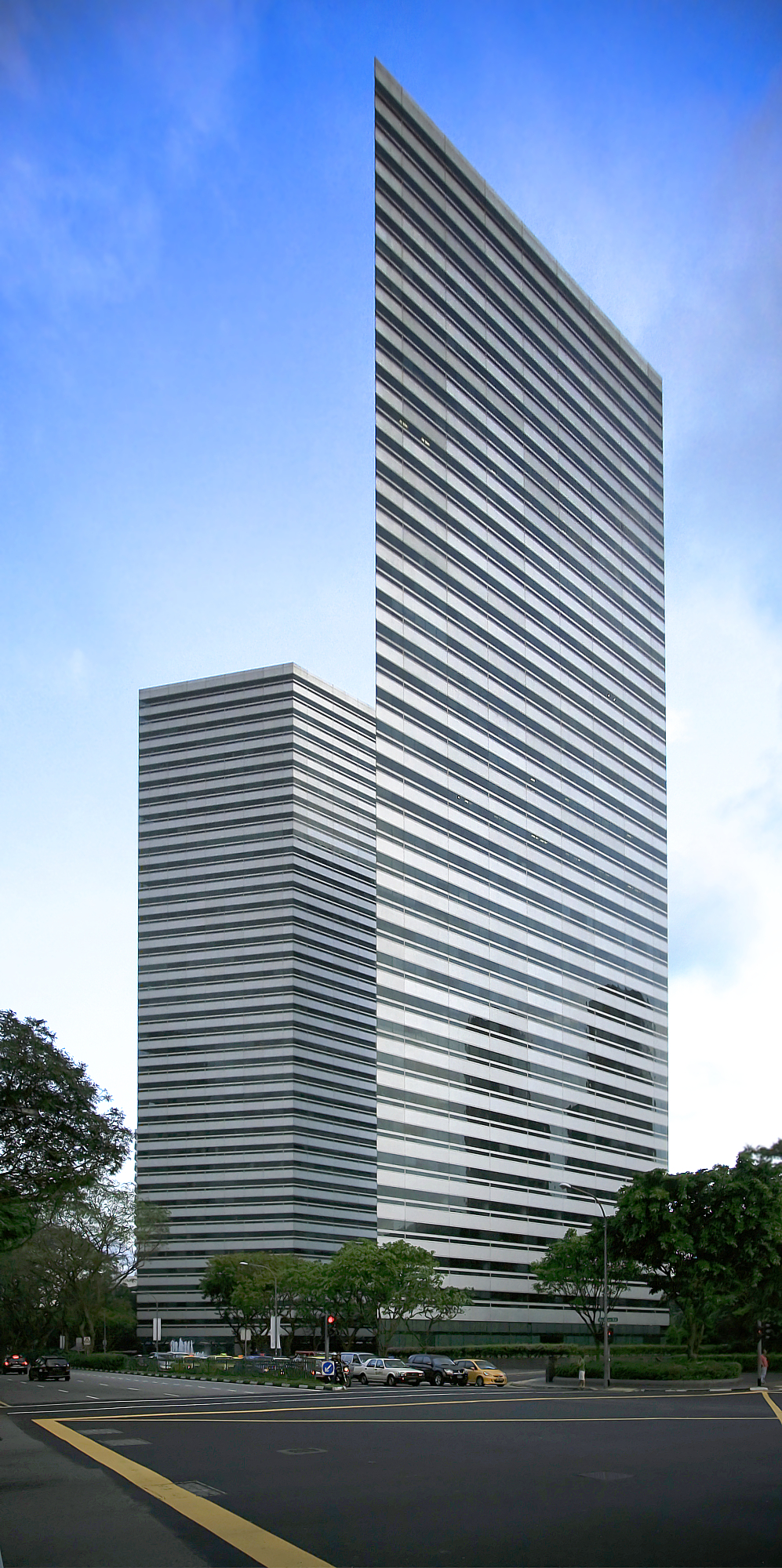
- Interactive map of the The Gateway area
- Alternative names: The Gateway East; The Gateway West

General information
- Type: Commercial offices
- Location: Beach Road; Downtown Core, Singapore
- Coordinates: 1.2988°N 103.8589°E
- Completed: 1990

Height
- Roof: 150 m (490 ft)

Technical details
- Floor count: 37; 2 below ground

Design and construction
- Architects: I. M. Pei; Chua Ka Seng and Partners Chartered Architects
- Main contractor: T.Y. Lin Structural Engineers

The Gateway is a 37-storey, 150 m (490 ft), skyscraper complex completed in April 1990 on Beach Road in the Downtown Core of Singapore. The two buildings are named The Gateway East and The Gateway West.

The embassy of Mexico is located on the 3rd floor of The Gateway East. The Singapore office of Mott MacDonald, a global engineering, management and development consultancy, is located on the 35th floor of The Gateway East.

== Architecture ==
The architecture of The Gateway has been described as "world class" by the National Library Board. The buildings were designed by the U.S.-based architect, I. M. Pei. The local Singaporean architectural firm that worked on this project was Chua Ka Seng and Partners Chartered Architects (CKSP). T.Y. Lin Structural Engineers from San Francisco also collaborated on the project.

The shape of the buildings is trapezoidal, which is similar to the form used by I. M. Pei in the critically acclaimed National Gallery of Art East Building in Washington, D.C.

== Tenants ==
The building's anchor tenants include companies like DHL, Mott MacDonald, Canon, Y Soft as well as the International Table Tennis Federation and Remy Cointreau International.

Massing model of I M Pei's The Gateway in Singapore.

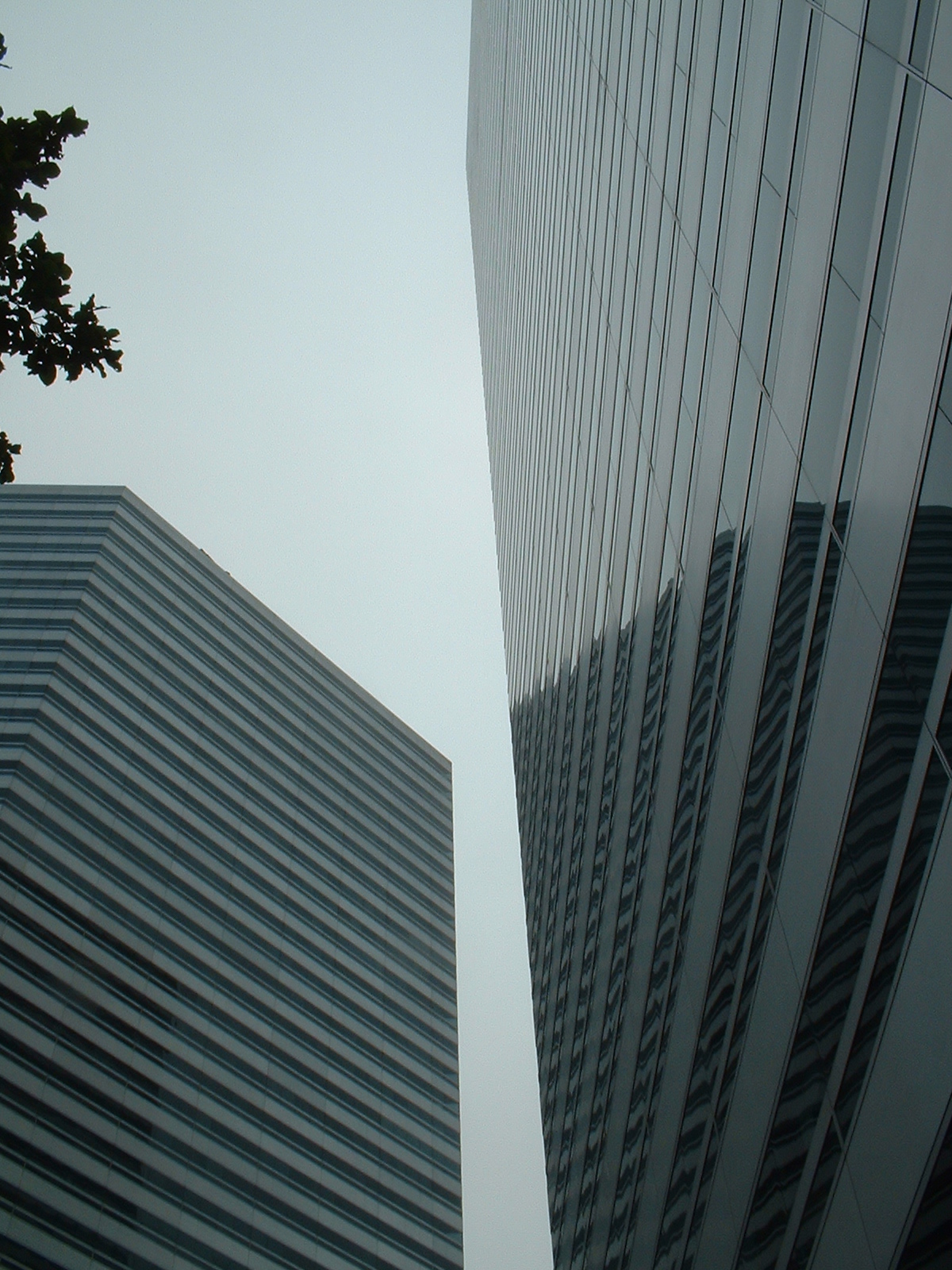
The angular form of The Gateway
