= Clarke Quay MRT station =

Mass Rapid Transit station in Singapore

Clarke Quay NE5 克拉码头 கிளார்க் கீ
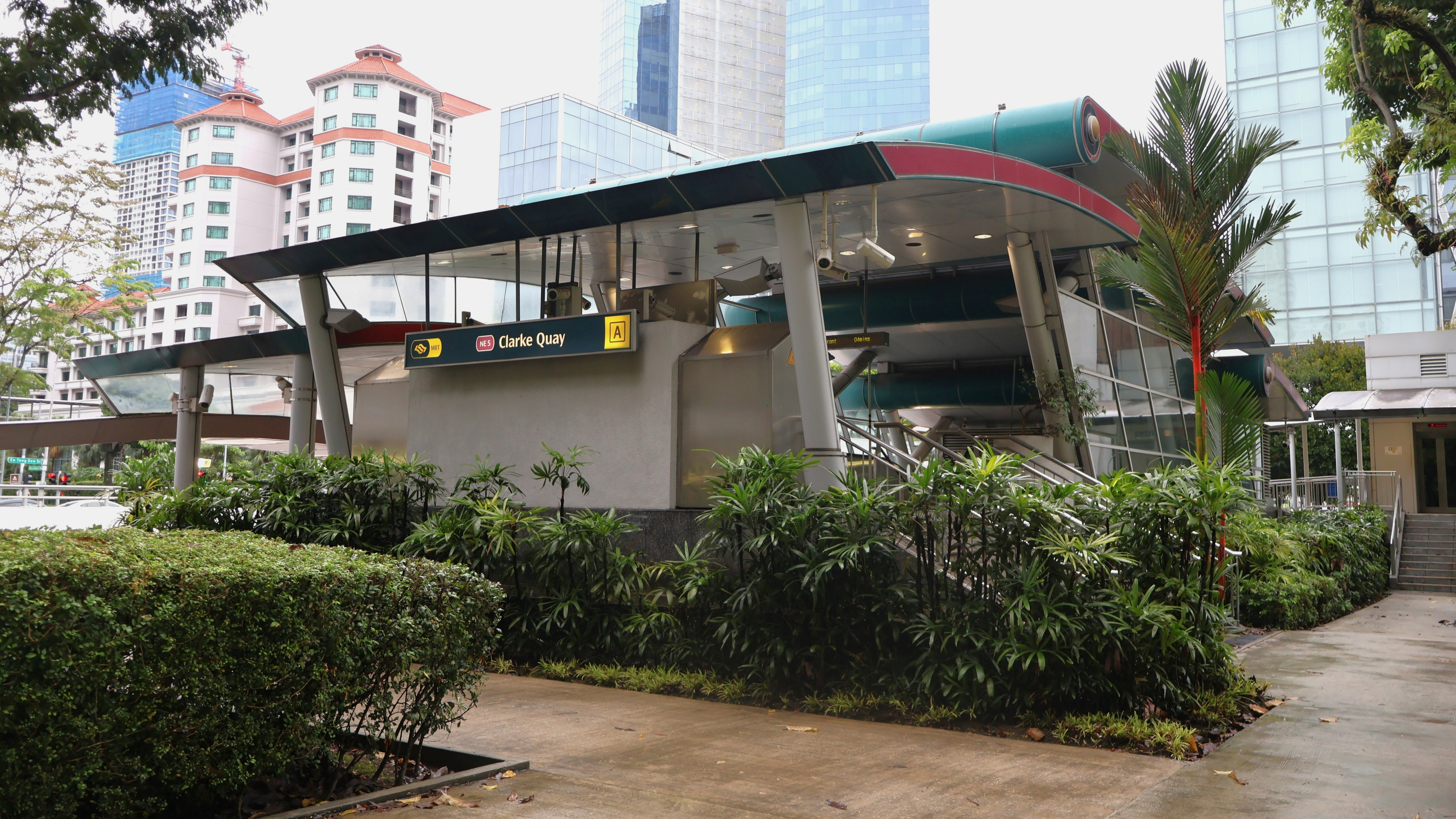
- Exit A of Clarke Quay station

General information
- Location: 10 Eu Tong Sen Street, Singapore 059815
- Coordinates: 01°17′19″N 103°50′48″E
- System: Mass Rapid Transit (MRT) station
- Owner: Land Transport Authority
- Operator: SBS Transit
- Line: North East Line
- Platforms: 2 (1 island platform)
- Tracks: 2
- Connections: Bus, taxi

Construction
- Structure type: Underground
- Platform levels: 1
- Parking: Yes (Clarke Quay Central)
- Accessible: Yes

History
- Opened: 20 June 2003; 23 years ago

Passengers
- June 2024: 12,505 per day

Services
Preceding station	Mass Rapid Transit	Following station
Chinatown towards HarbourFront	North East Line	Dhoby Ghaut towards Punggol Coast
Track layout
Location
- Location within Singapore Rail central area

Clarke Quay MRT station is an underground Mass Rapid Transit (MRT) station on the North East Line (NEL) in Singapore. Situated along Eu Tong Sen Street, near the junction of Merchant Road and North Canal Road, it lies south of the Singapore River underneath The Central building. The station serves Clarke Quay and Boat Quay, as well as other landmarks such as Hong Lim Park, The Riverwalk, and the Swissotel Merchant Court.

Announced in March 1996, the station was part of plans to redevelop the Singapore River area. The construction of tunnels between this station and Dhoby Ghaut station constituted the second tunnel crossing under the Singapore River, and the first to use tunnel boring machines beneath the riverbed. Explosives were also used in the hard rock under Fort Canning Hill and under the North–South Line tunnels near Dhoby Ghaut station. The station was completed on 20 June 2003. It is a designated Civil Defence shelter. The curvilinear entrances are designed to symbolise the flowing waters of the Singapore River, and the station features an Art in Transit artwork, The Reflections, by Chua Ek Kay.

== History ==
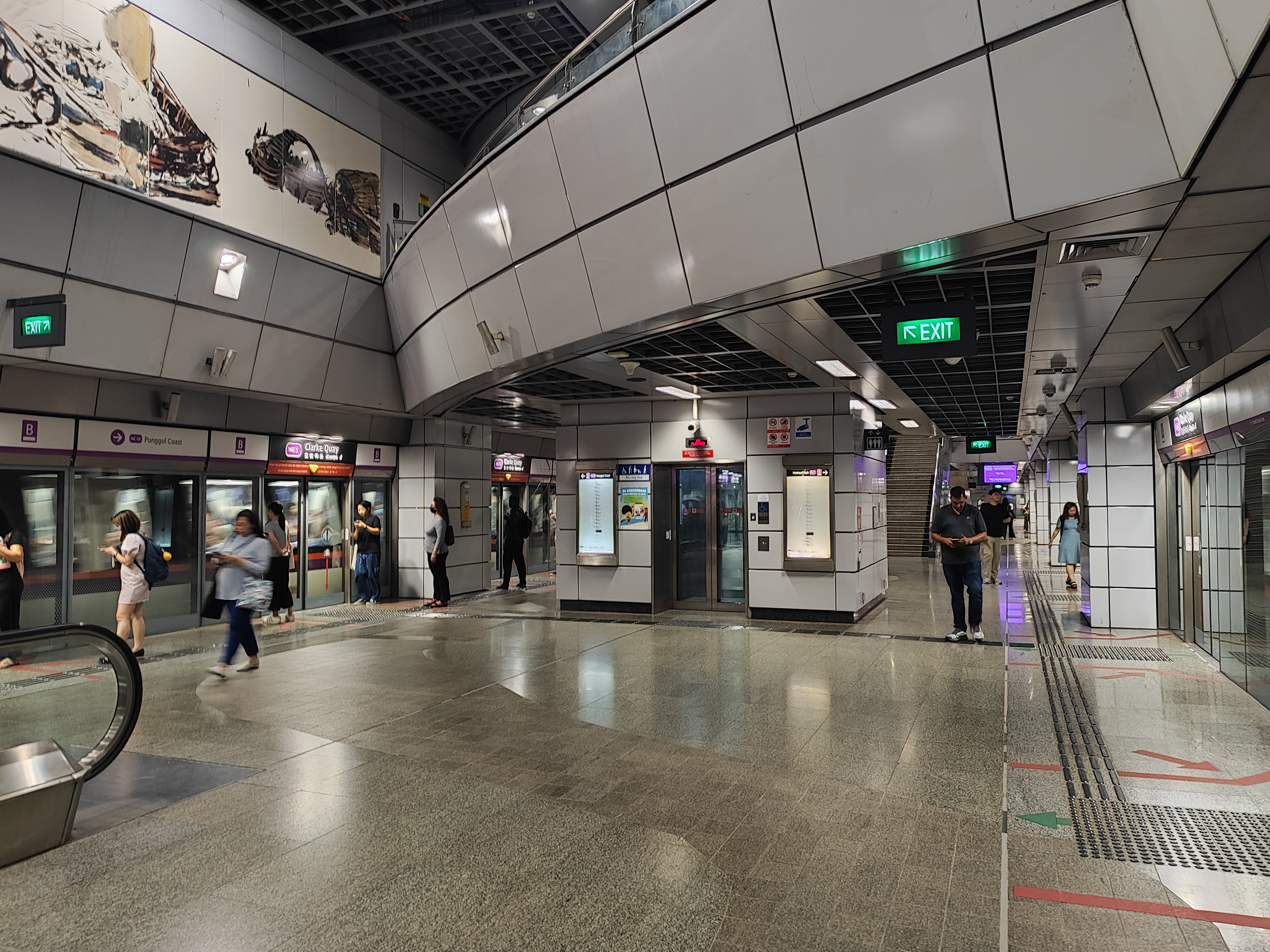
Platform level of the station

The North East Line (NEL) project, which was first proposed in 1984, received government approval in January 1996. Clarke Quay station was among the sixteen NEL stations announced by communications minister Mah Bow Tan that March. The Land Transport Authority (LTA) Deputy Chief Executive and his colleagues visited Clarke Quay for drinks in 1995. During their visit, they decided a station should be built under Ellenborough Market, which lay along the proposed NEL route. When the Urban Redevelopment Authority (URA) responded positively to the suggestion, the LTA proceeded with the station's construction to capitalise on what Leong described as the Singapore River riverfront's "commercial and aesthetic potential".

Some property developers interviewed by The Straits Times criticised that the station was not more "centrally located" to serve the developments near Robertson Quay. Others, such as DBS Land and Far East Organisation, supported the proposed station. Goh Chai Khim of Jones Lang Wootton said it would fill a "major gap" in transportation access to the area. The contract for the design and construction of Clarke Quay station and tunnels was awarded to a joint venture of Nishimatsu Construction, Lum Chang Building Contractors, and Bachy Soletanche Singapore. The station opened on 20 June 2003 along with the other NEL stations.

=== Station construction ===
The Ellenborough Market stallholders had to move out by 31 March 1997 as the market would be demolished for the station. Due to the soft marine clay, a dam was built around the station site, and contiguous concrete wall panels were installed via diaphragm walling.

The station was constructed on the south bank of the Singapore River in soft Kallang Formation clays, peaty soil, and fluvial sand overlying weathered Jurong Formation sedimentary rock. Excavated to a depth of 22.2 metres (73 ft), the site was supported by a 1.2-metre (3 ft 11 in) thick diaphragm wall braced with seven vertical levels of temporary struts. (Note: The surface elevation is 102 m (335 ft) and the founding level of the station's raft slab is at an elevation of 79.8 m (262 ft).) Due to the station's irregular shape, excavation and installation of preloaded struts proceeded sequentially in blocks from the ends toward the middle, using straight struts in the centre and diagonal struts at the ends.

The contractors had to monitor and minimise any ground movement of the heritage shophouses by the river and the Thong Chai building. Some of the perimeter walls were also installed near the river wall. Uneven settlement was detected at the APG building along New Bridge Road as it had separate foundations. Following a thorough survey of the building, the LTA engineers deemed it safe for use and made repairs and restorations.

Construction of the two long entrance structures for Clarke Quay Station required excavating to a depth of about 9 m (30 ft) in soft marine clay. To provide resistance against upwards movement of each foundation (base heave), the entrances were constructed within 12 m-long (39 ft) sheet piles and supported by a jet grouted slab. These slabs were tied directly into the surrounding sheet pile retaining walls and to bored piles below that served as the permanent foundations for the entrances.

=== Tunnel construction ===
The NEL tunnels cross the Singapore River near Coleman Bridge. This was the second MRT river crossing, and the first to use the tunnel boring machine (TBM) beneath the riverbed. The LTA initially planned for the tunnels under the Singapore River to be constructed using the cut-and-cover method, but the contractors instead proposed using the TBM. Compared to the cut-and-cover method, the TBM was considered less time-consuming, had lower risks of tunnel flooding, and would minimise environmental damage to Clarke Quay and the river. As the tunnels were only 10 metres (33 ft) below the riverbed in the original plans, it was decided to further lower the tunnels and the station by 4.4 metres (14 ft). This allowed the tunnels to be constructed under the riverbed with a soil cover of 5.8 m (19 ft), equivalent to one tunnel diameter. The TBM had to tunnel through a layer of marine clay with varying thickness, loose fluvial sands, and weathered sedimentary rocks that could create varying resistance to the TBM. Hence, it was essential to maintain effective control of the excavation rate to keep the TBM in alignment. Despite opposition by the Clarke Quay management, the launch shaft was placed at the former Whampoa Garden due to optimal soil conditions. (Note: A launching shaft connects the surface to the underground works and supports TBM lowering, assembly and launch operations.)

Construction of the southbound tunnel from the shaft to Clarke Quay station began in June 1999 and was completed on 31 July of the same year. Due to space constraints at the north end of the station, the contractor employed a specialised lifting system, the Aero-Caster, to turn the Earth Pressure Balance (EPB) TBM around. The Aero-Caster system used air-inflated plates and three air compressors to turn the TBM over a smooth polyethylene surface on a near-frictionless film of air. The northbound drive was launched on 19 October 1999 and completed within a month. The EPB TBM was disassembled and redeployed to the south end of the station for the tunnel drive to Chinatown. This tunnel drive passed through weathered Jurong Formation rock and soft Kallang Formation soil, and ran below Eu Tong Sen Street and New Bridge Road.

For the drive between the temporary shaft and Dhoby Ghaut, two TBMs with exposed excavation heads (Open Faced Shield Machines) were used to tunnel through weathered rock and boulder clays. Sensitive structures, such as an underground enclosed reservoir atop Fort Canning and a telecom microwave tower, required close monitoring. Explosives were used for the hard rock under Fort Canning Hill. A minor ground settlement at Fort Canning Country Club created a large void above the TBM, and grout was pumped in to prevent further settlement. The tunnelling also encountered a large inflow of water; pipes were drilled into the rock face to channel the water out and prevent it from seeping into the rock cracks.

The tunnel excavation also exposed a layer of sand in the rock face directly underneath the Oxley Rise flyover, causing slow settlement under the flyover. As survey teams established monitoring points at the flyover, pit bosses and miners hammered timber into the ground to stop ground loss. (Note: Ground loss is the volume of soil excavated in excess of designed excavation. It is also known as volume loss of ground.) The ground was filled with chemical grout to add strength and cohesion to the soil before tunnelling resumed. Explosives were also used for another section of hard rock under the North–South Line (NSL) tunnels near Dhoby Ghaut station, as manual excavation was too slow. Jet-grout arches supported the NSL tunnels while tunnelling near Dhoby Ghaut station.

== Details ==
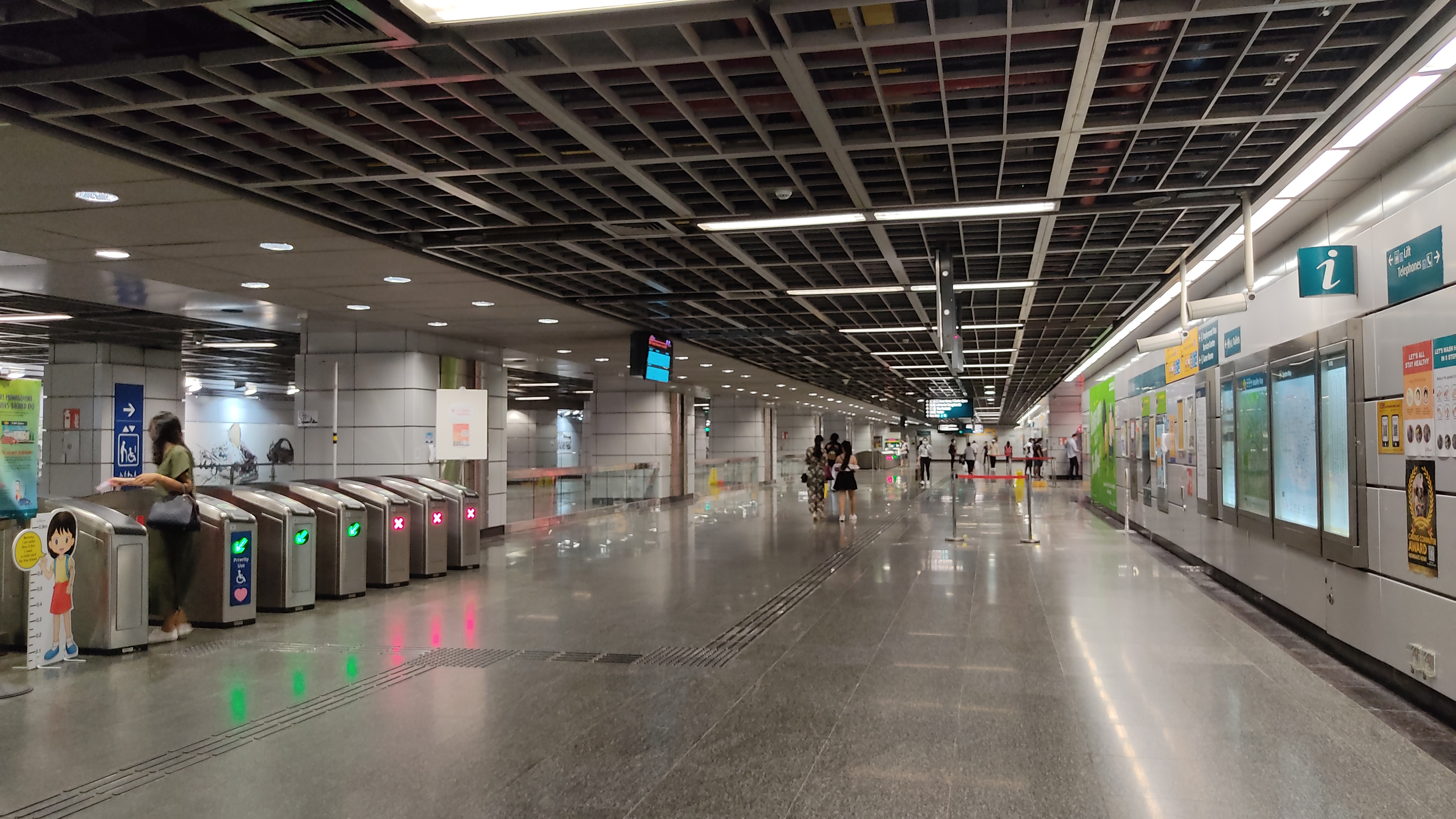
Concourse level of the station

Clarke Quay station serves the North East Line (NEL) of the Singapore MRT, and lies between Chinatown and Dhoby Ghaut stations. The station code is NE5. The station is operated by SBS Transit as part of the NEL. The station operates daily from about 5:50 am to 12:00 am. Train frequencies vary from 2.5 to 5.75 minutes.

Located along Eu Tong Sen Street on the south bank of the Singapore River, the station is near the junction of Merchant Road and North Canal Road. The station sits underneath The Central, a retail and residential development. Other developments surrounding the station include Hong Lim Park, Speakers' Corner, Clarke Quay, Boat Quay, Asian Civilisations Museum, Fort Canning Hill, Park Regis Hotel, The Riverwalk, Swissotel Merchant Court and The Riverside Piazza. The station is also within walking distance of Fort Canning station on the Downtown Line.

Clarke Quay station was designed by SAA Architects. The curved roof design of the station entrances draws inspiration from the flowing waters of the Singapore River, and its colour scheme was intended to evoke the boats ferrying tourists and locals along the river. The station is designed with a spacious interior and large columns to support the commercial development built above the station.

The station is designated as a Civil Defence (CD) shelter: it is designed to accommodate at least 7,500 people and withstand airstrikes and chemical attacks. Equipment essential for the CD shelter's operations is mounted on shock absorbers to prevent damage during a bombing. When the electrical supply to the shelter is disrupted, there are backup generators to keep operations going. The shelter has dedicated decontamination chambers and dry toilets with collection bins that send human waste out of the shelter. Like all other NEL stations, the platforms are wheelchair-accessible. A tactile system, consisting of tiles with rounded or elongated raised studs, guides visually impaired commuters through the station. Dedicated tactile routes connect the station entrances to the platforms.

== Artwork ==
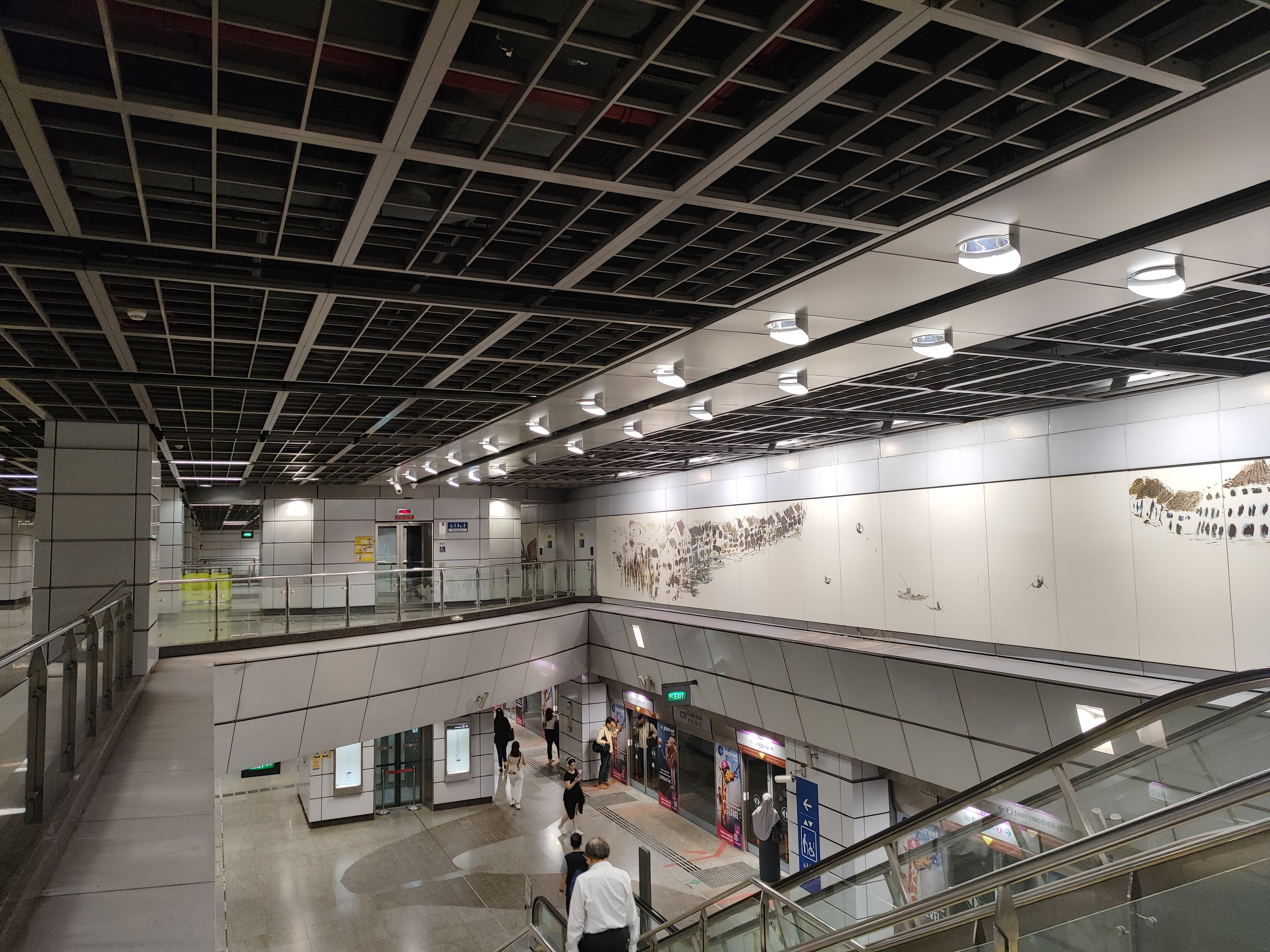
The mural above the platform level

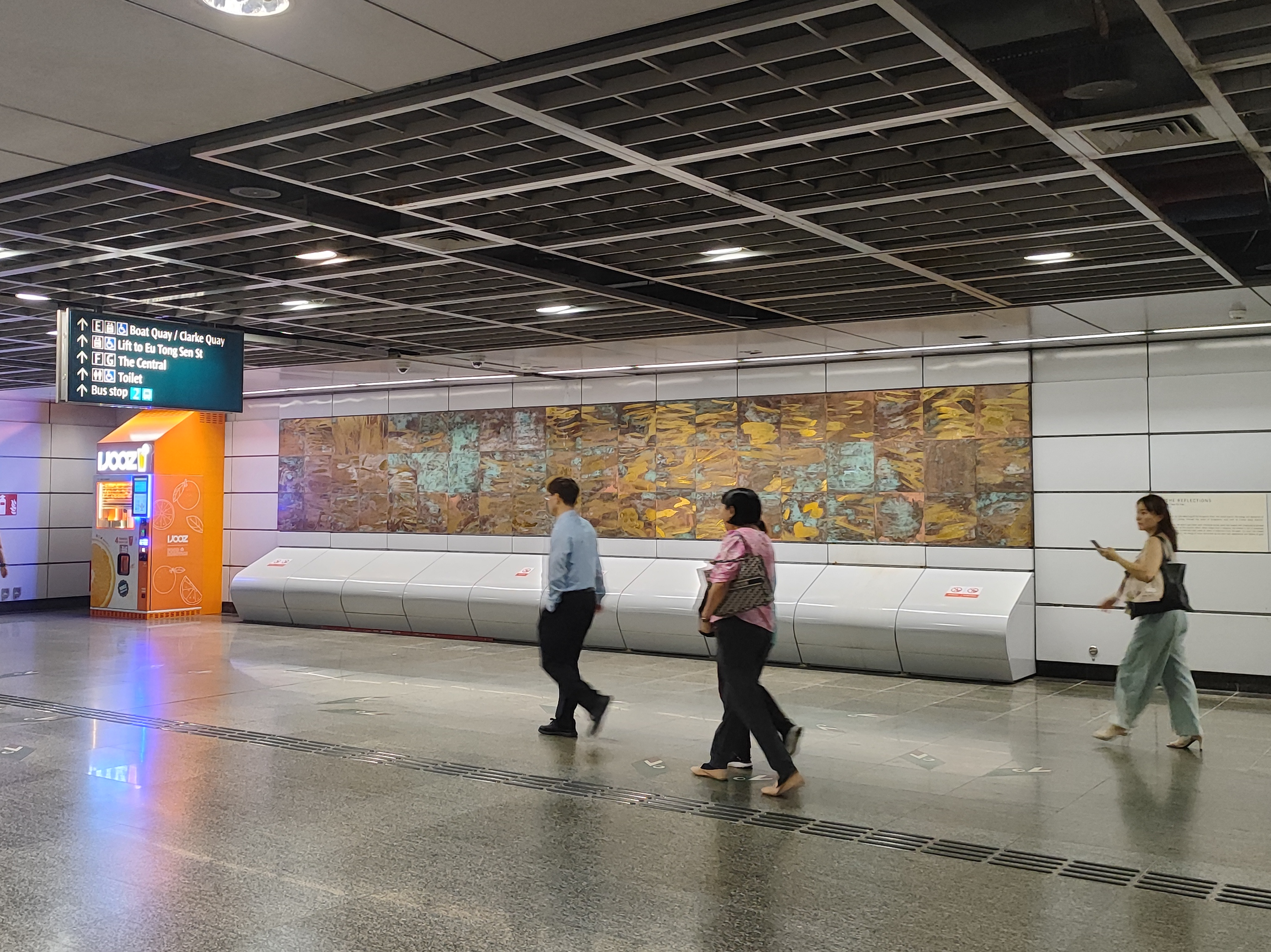
The brass mural along the concourse

The Reflections by Chua Ek Kay is displayed at this station as part of the Art in Transit programme, a showcase of public artworks on the MRT network. The work consists of a 60-metre (200 ft) mural portraying scenes from life on the Singapore River, as well as a 20-metre (66 ft) acid-etched brass mural intended to evoke reflections of light on the water. Floor tiles featuring painted eyes similar to those found on tongkangs or Chinese junks complement the murals and serve as navigational aids for commuters.

Chua first worked on the silkscreened mural, originally rendered in ink on rice paper before being transferred onto vitreous enamel panels in the United Kingdom. The brass mural was produced from 60 brass sheets, each weighing eight kilograms (18 lb) and backed with cement board. Chua applied brushstrokes to the sheets before immersing them in a chemical bath, producing an etched surface with patches ranging from turquoise and green to orange and dark brown. He personally oversaw the production of the brass panels and worked with stakeholders, including the station's architect. This collaboration resulted in changes to the station's colour scheme from beige to grey to complement the brass artwork.

The work was inspired by Chua's observations of contemporary life along the Singapore River and childhood memories of the bustling Teochew Street area, where the station now stands. He intended for the murals to depict aspects of the river's history and significance, including the arrival of early migrants in the 19th century, the movement of tongkangs along the river, its surrounding architecture and street celebrations along its banks. Chua described the two murals as contrasting in character, the brass work using more varied brushstrokes and colours to suggest movement and reflection, whereas the silkscreened mural uses broader strokes. The brass mural's more abstract treatment was intended to allow viewers greater scope for interpretation through its changing colours, movement and rhythm.

Chua used Chinese brushwork in both murals, but varied the direction and character of the strokes. The colours in the brass work shift from "dominant reds" to "striking greens", accented with traces of gold on aquamarine. He described the brass mural as having a "shimmering, dynamic effect" and associated its changing colours with the river's changing appearance under different weather conditions. LTA also described the works as exploring the theme of reflection and capturing what it called the "energy and life" of the Singapore River.
