= Orchard Point =

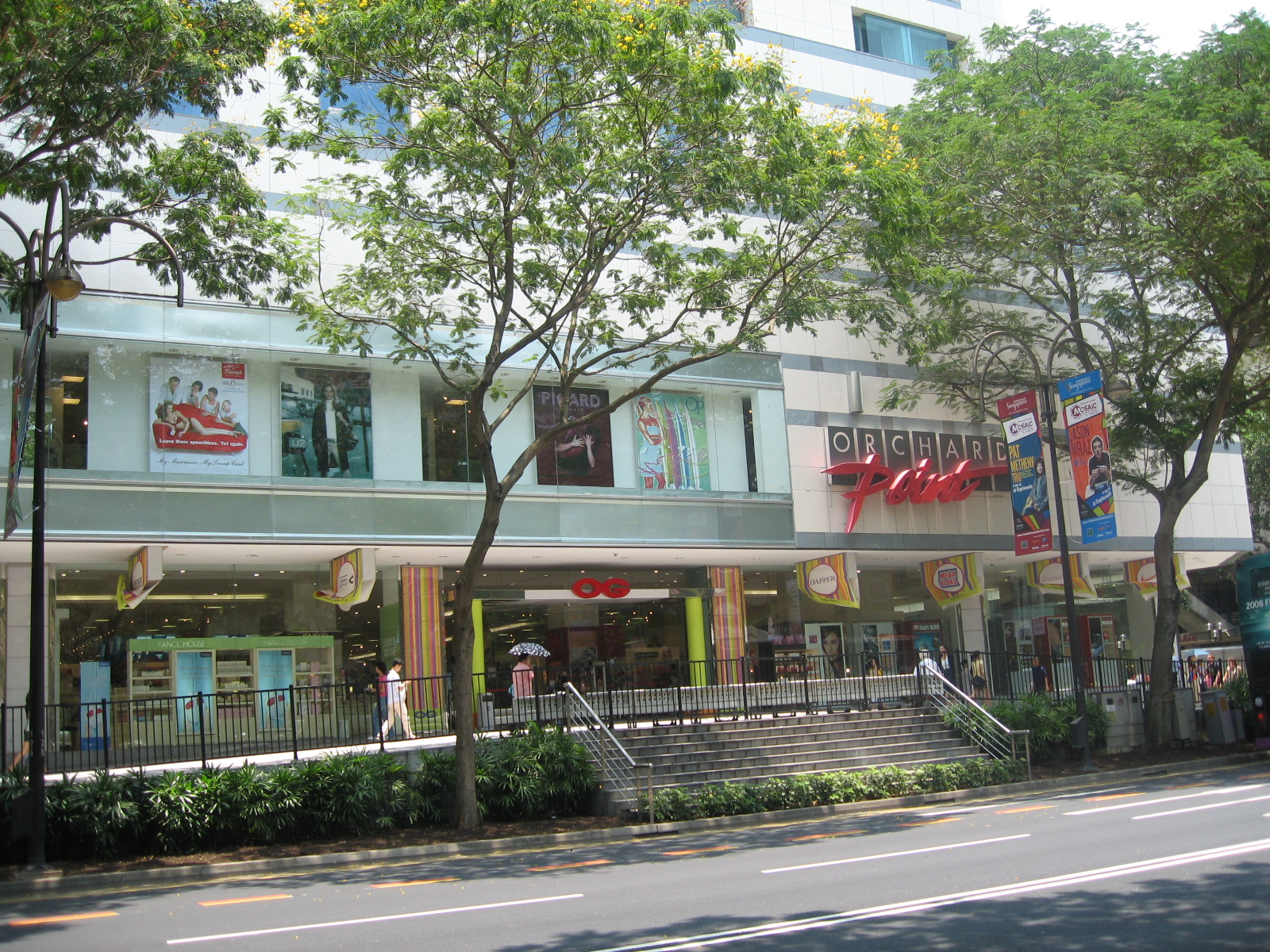
- Orchard Point
- Location: 160 Orchard Road, Singapore 238842
- Coordinates: 1.3015°N 103.8383°E
- Opened: 1982; 44 years ago

Orchard Point is a shopping centre in Singapore.

== History ==
Orchard Point was built in 1982, replacing the Orchard Road Market. In July 1989, Pidemco Holdings announced plans to turn Orchard Point into a centre for arts and crafts. The shopping centre received a $29 million face-lift in 1991. The facelift also included the introduction of two curved escalators, making Orchard Point the first shopping centre in Singapore to have curved escalators. Following the facelift, fashion boutiques Episode, Jessica and Excursion became the mall's anchor tenants. The shopping centre officially reopened on 22 March 1993.

Australian fabric, crafts and home furnishings retailer Spotlight opened its first overseas outlet in Orchard Point at the end of August 1995. The store took up the entire third floor of the mall.

In 2001, the mall was sold to department store group OG. Many of the centre's art centres and galleries began moving out of the centre in 2002 due to the rising cost of rent. OG closed its outlet in the mall in 2022. OG then leased the space to Hao Corp, for use as a supermarket and dining space known as Taste Orchard. The lease was terminated in September 2025. On 16 January 2026, Hao Mart lodged a lawsuit against OG as the supermarket leased the Taste Orchard premises from OG, but the tenancy ended before the 7.5-year lease was up.
