= Pull printing =

Pull printing is a printing feature where a user's print job is held on a server (server-based pull printing) or on a user's workstation (serverless pull printing) and released by the user at any printing device (pulled to the printer) which supports this feature. A number of software products exist that support pull printing. The user needs to first authenticate themselves at the printer, either using embedded software (e.g. i.c.w. a pincode), or an external device (e.g. i.c.w. a smartcard). Once they have been authenticated, the user may select from the list of print jobs from the server, web portal or directly from the client PC which ones they wish to release at the current device. Some systems also allow delegation where the user may access print jobs submitted by other users or systems.

== Advantages ==
- Flexibility: The user can print first and choose the printer afterwards (while standing next to it).
- IT management: instead of having to manage hundreds of print queues on print servers and multiple printers on the user desktops there is only one print queue on each user PC.
- Costs and environment: Reduces uncollected paper.
- Green IT: the server-less flavour of pull printing allows the removal of all print servers throughout the company. A widget can show users the environmental impact of printing by showing them the number of trees and amount of CO_{2} and energy used to deliver a print job.
- Security: No more unattended documents on printers output trays, the user must authenticate, increasing privacy policy compliance.
- Accounting: Although this is not really a Pull Printing feature, centralized printing solutions often come with these additional features (e.g. reporting, charging, monitoring).

== Disadvantages ==
- Speed: The user has to wait for the job to be copied and processed from the moment the print job is pulled.
- Costs: Extra licensing and hardware.
- Specialised software may be required on the server and also possibly on the printer.
- Compatibility: The print driver used when the user initially prints must be compatible with all the devices that the user might release their print job to. Some software solutions can perform conversions or a common print driver to negate this requirement.
- Printer Hardware-Specific: Often solutions are only compatible with certain vendor's own hardware; there are however exceptions.
