= Ellenborough Market =

Former market in Singapore

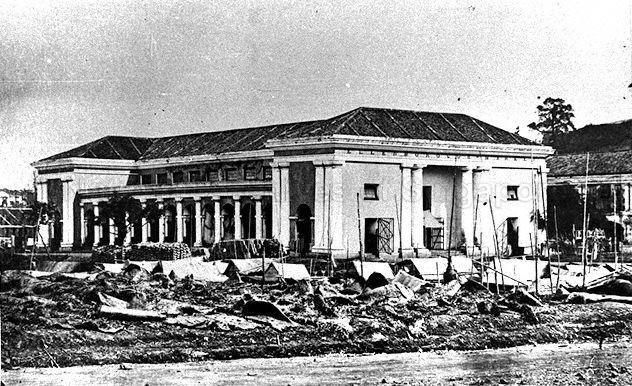
- Ellenborough Market in the 1860s
- Interactive map of the Ellenborough Market area
- Alternative names: Teochew Market; New Market; Sin Pa Sat; Pasar Bahru

General information
- Location: Ellenborough Street, Boat Quay, Singapore
- Coordinates: 1°17′20.391″N 103°50′47.928″E
- Named for: Edward Law, 1st Earl of Ellenborough
- Construction started: May 1845; 181 years ago
- Demolished: 1891; 135 years ago (first); 30 January 1968; 58 years ago (second); 1997; 29 years ago (third)

Design and construction
- Engineer: Charles Edward Faber

Ellenborough Market (Chinese: 爱伦坡巴刹), also known as Teochew Market (Chinese: 潮州巴刹), New Market, Sin Pa Sat (Chinese: 新巴刹) and Pasar Bahru, was a market at the former Ellenborough Street along the Singapore River in Singapore.

== History ==
=== Pre-independence period ===
Construction of a market named after Edward Law, 1st Earl of Ellenborough began in May 1845 by engineer Charles Edward Faber. Faber was criticised for shoddily constructing the market, with cracks in several parts of the walls. The market was known for selling seafood, especially fish. It was sometimes nicknamed Teochew Market due to the high population of Teochews in the area.

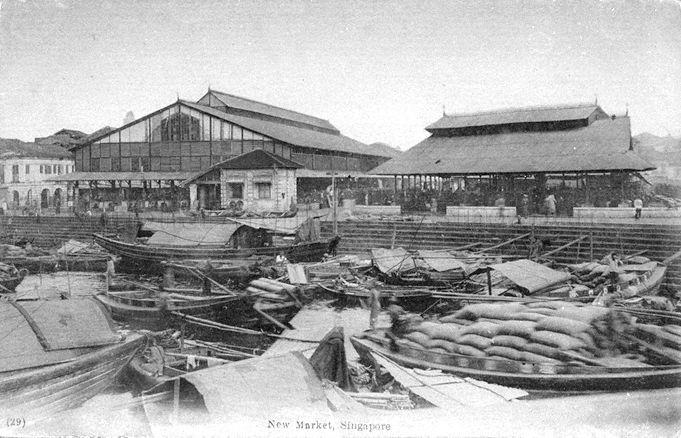
The second Ellenborough Market in 1910

Between 1891 and 1894, Ellenborough Market was rebuilt. The new market was called "Pasar Bahru" in Malay and "Sin Pa Sat" in Hokkien, both of which translate to "New Market". It was also nicknamed "Teochew Market" as the Teochews populated the area. An extension was built next to the building in 1899, and was made using a cast iron structure from an exhibition in Edinburgh, Scotland.

In 1947, a proposal for an extension was made to modernise the market. Construction of a one-way street around the market was approved in 1952 to speed up deliveries to the market.

=== Contemporary period and demise ===
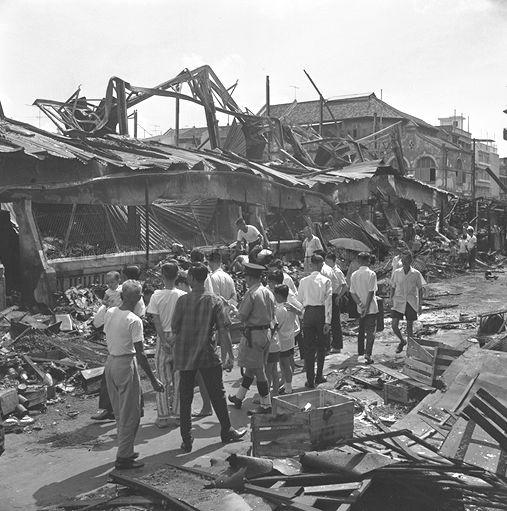
Aftermath of the fire at Ellenborough Market on 30 January 1968

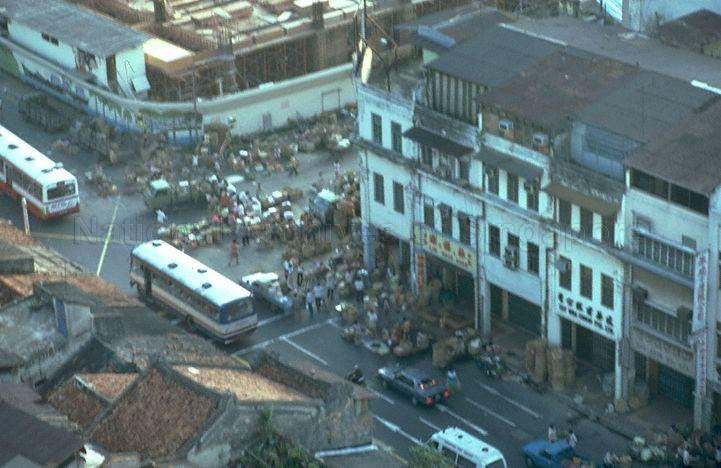
The third Ellenborough Market in 1985

On 30 January 1968, the market was destroyed by a fire resulting from firecrackers set off during the Chinese New Year celebration. The market was demolished, and a 22-storey residential flat was built over the site, which opened in 1972. A new market was then built by 1978, spanning two levels with a hawker centre on a third level.

By 31 March 1997, Ellenborough Market was fully vacated to make way for the construction of the North East Line.

Today, the site of the former market is occupied by Clarke Quay Central shopping mall and Clarke Quay MRT station on the North East Line underground.

== Incidents ==
On 14 July 1898, the corpse of a Chinese man was found in Ellenborough Market. The same year, on 6 October, another Chinese man was found in critical condition and died on the way to the Central Police Station. On 25 July 1900, a woman and her son died in their house at 39 Upper Nankin Street after consuming rotten fish roe found discarded in the market.

== Legacy ==
Ellenborough Market Café, located at 20 Merchant Road, is named after the market.
