= Arab Street =

Area in Singapore

Coordinates: 1°18′8.1″N 103°51′29.6″E

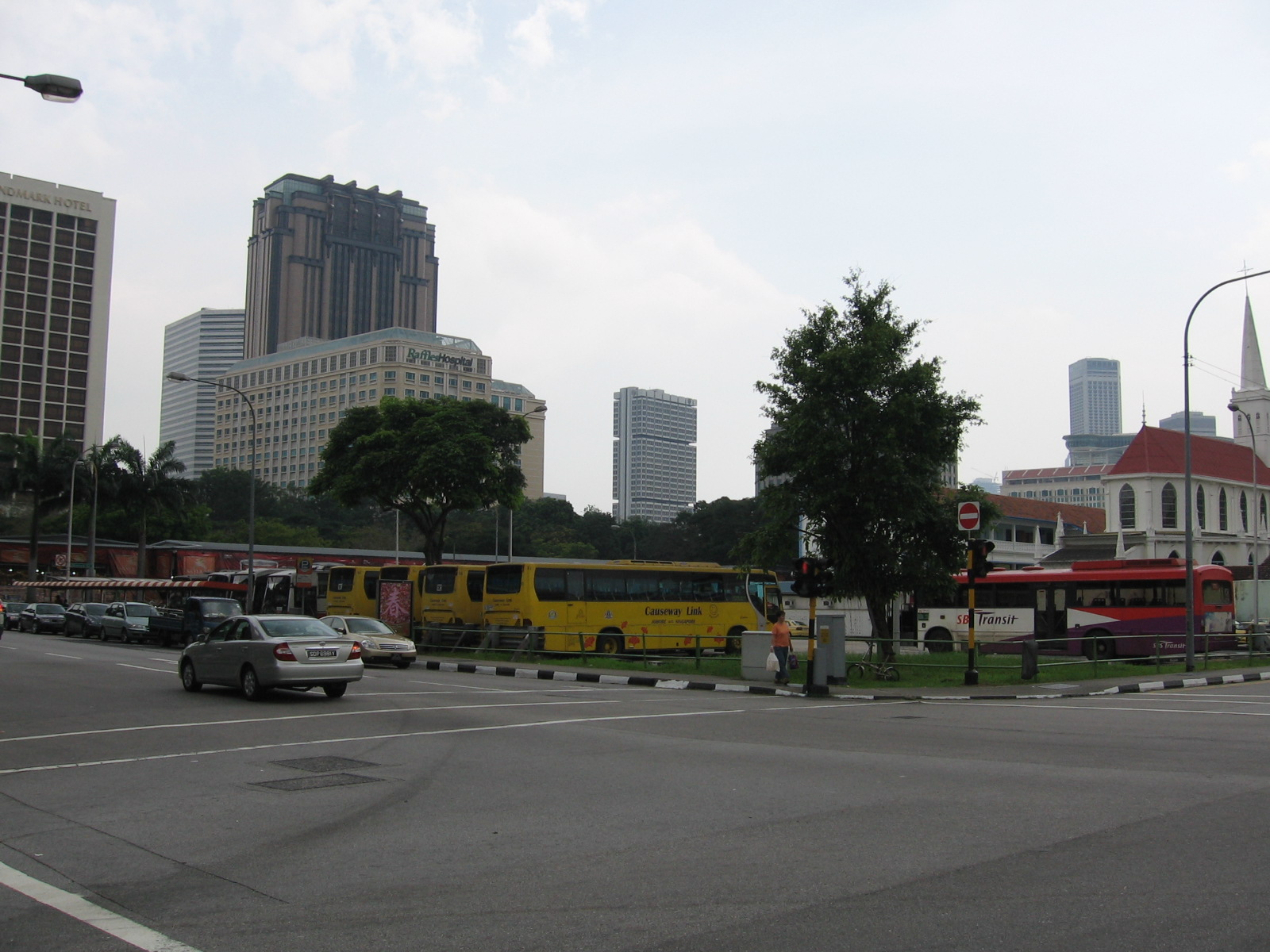
Arab Street, next to the Queen Street Bus Terminal.

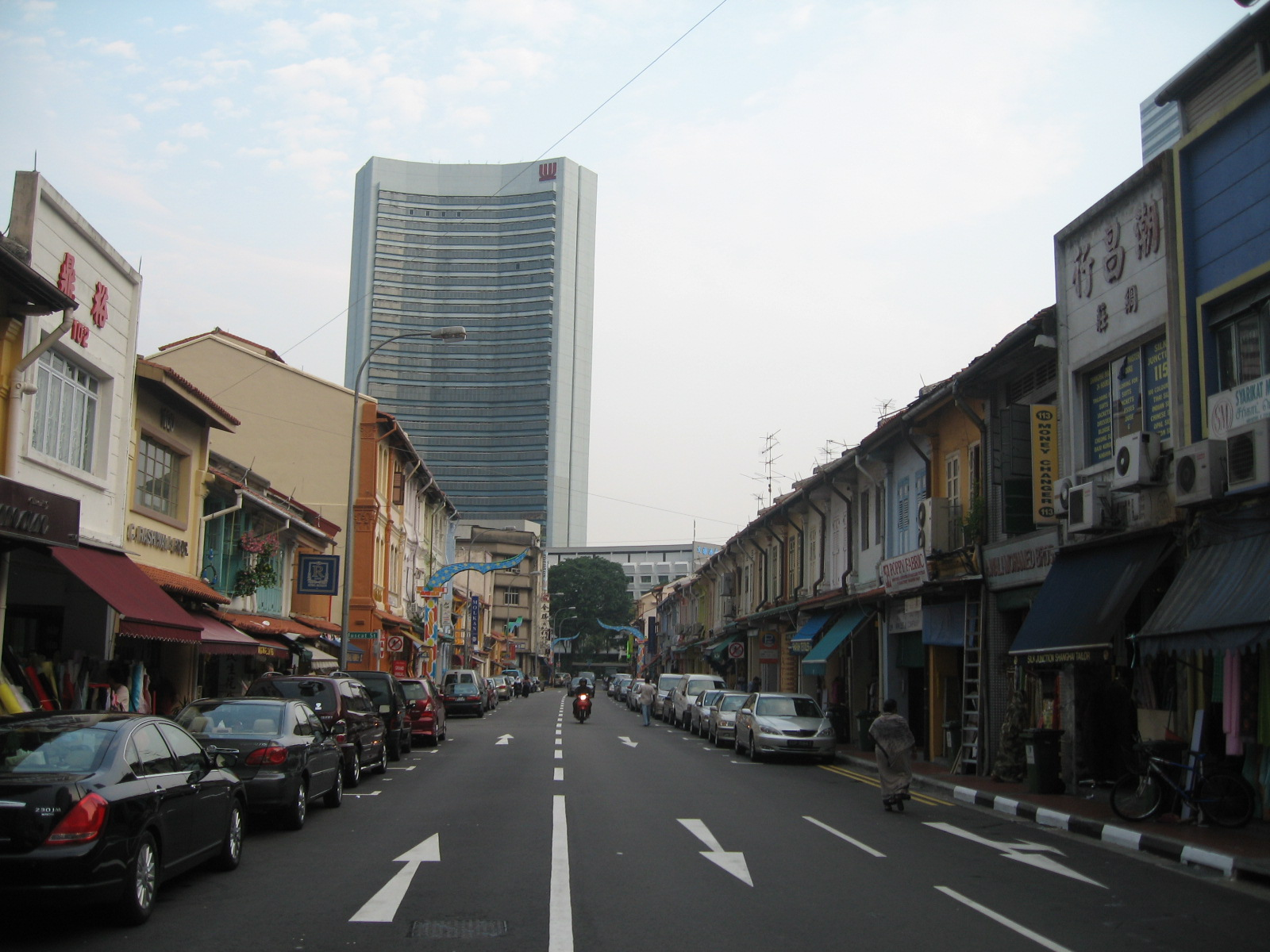
Arab Street at Kampong Glam, with shophouses on both sides of the street.

Arab Street (Chinese: 阿拉伯街; Malay: Jalan Arab) is an area located in the Kampong Glam neighbourhood in Singapore. Arab Street can refer to both the street name as well as the surrounding area, which is typically considered to include other surrounding streets, such as but not limited to Bussorah Street, Haji Lane, Bali Lane and Muscat Street. Today, it is a considered a historical site with many conserved shophouses in the area.

== Etymology ==
There are two possible explanations for how the name came about:

1. One possible explanation was that an Arab merchant Syed Ali bin Mohamed Al Junied used to own the whole area, hence the choice of name;
2. Another possible explanation can be traced to Raffles' instructions as part of the Jackson Plan (also known as the Raffles Town Plan) to allocate the Kampong Glam area to both the Bugis (who had already previously settled there) as well as the Arabs.

== Notable landmarks ==
- Masjid Sultan
- The Projector
- Malay Heritage Centre
