= Gedung Kuning =

Yellow Mansion
- Gedung Kuning
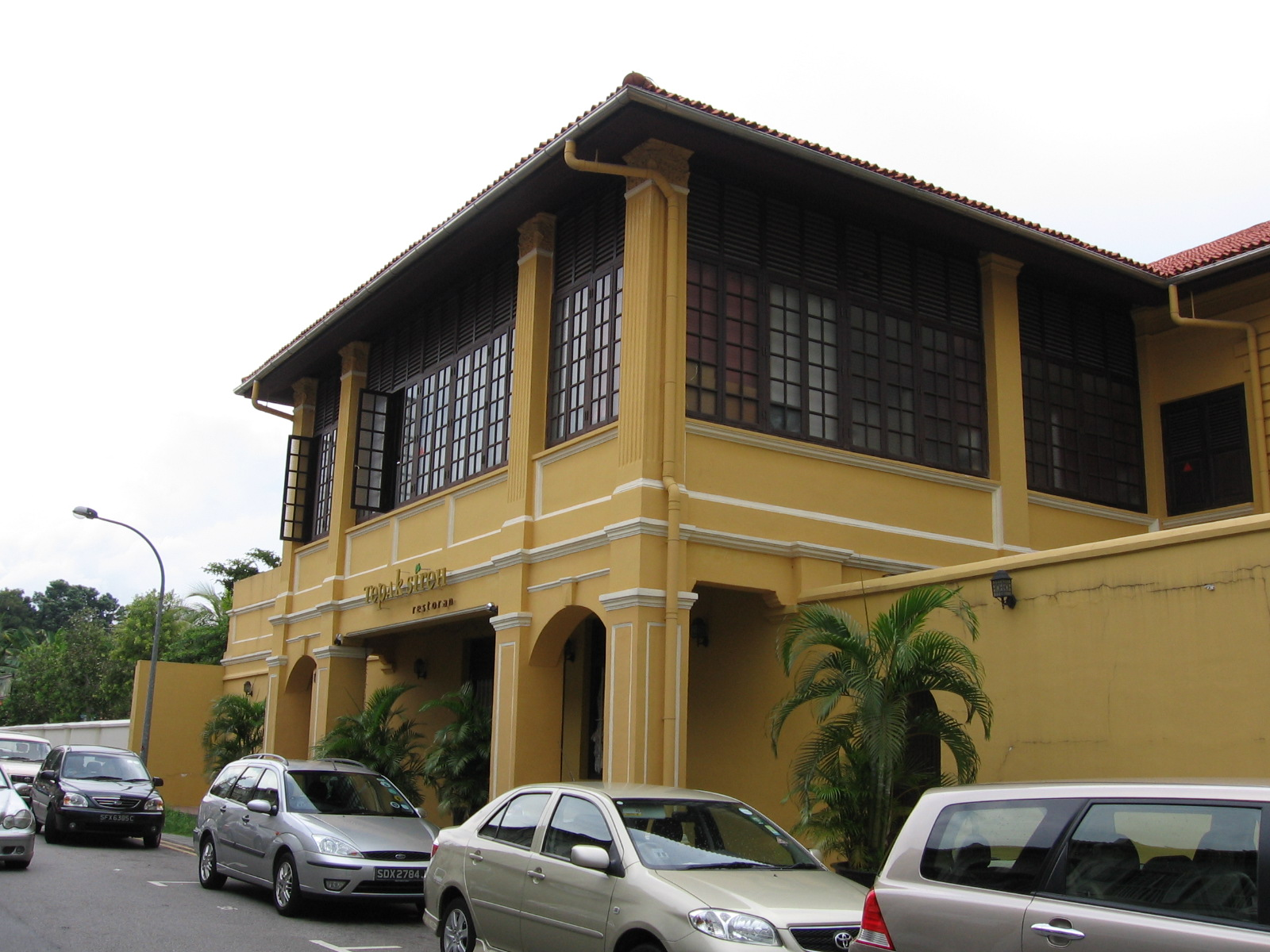
- Gedung Kuning (Yellow Mansion) at the Malay Heritage Centre, Singapore.

- Location within Singapore

General information
- Status: Completed
- Type: mansion
- Architectural style: Palladian
- Classification: A-2
- Location: Kampong Glam, 73 Sultan Gate, Singapore 198497, Singapore
- Coordinates: 1°18′07.9″N 103°51′36.0″E
- Current tenants: Restoran Tepak Sireh (2003-2012); Mamanda (2012-2019); Amazing Chambers Singapura (2019-present); Permata (2021-present)
- Named for: Yellow Mansion
- Opened: 1864
- Renovated: 1999 - 2003
- Owner: Malay Heritage Centre
- Landlord: Singapore Land Authority

Technical details
- Floor count: 2

Other information
- Number of restaurants: 1 Restoran Tepak Sireh (2003-2012); Mamanda (2012-2019); Permata (2021-present)

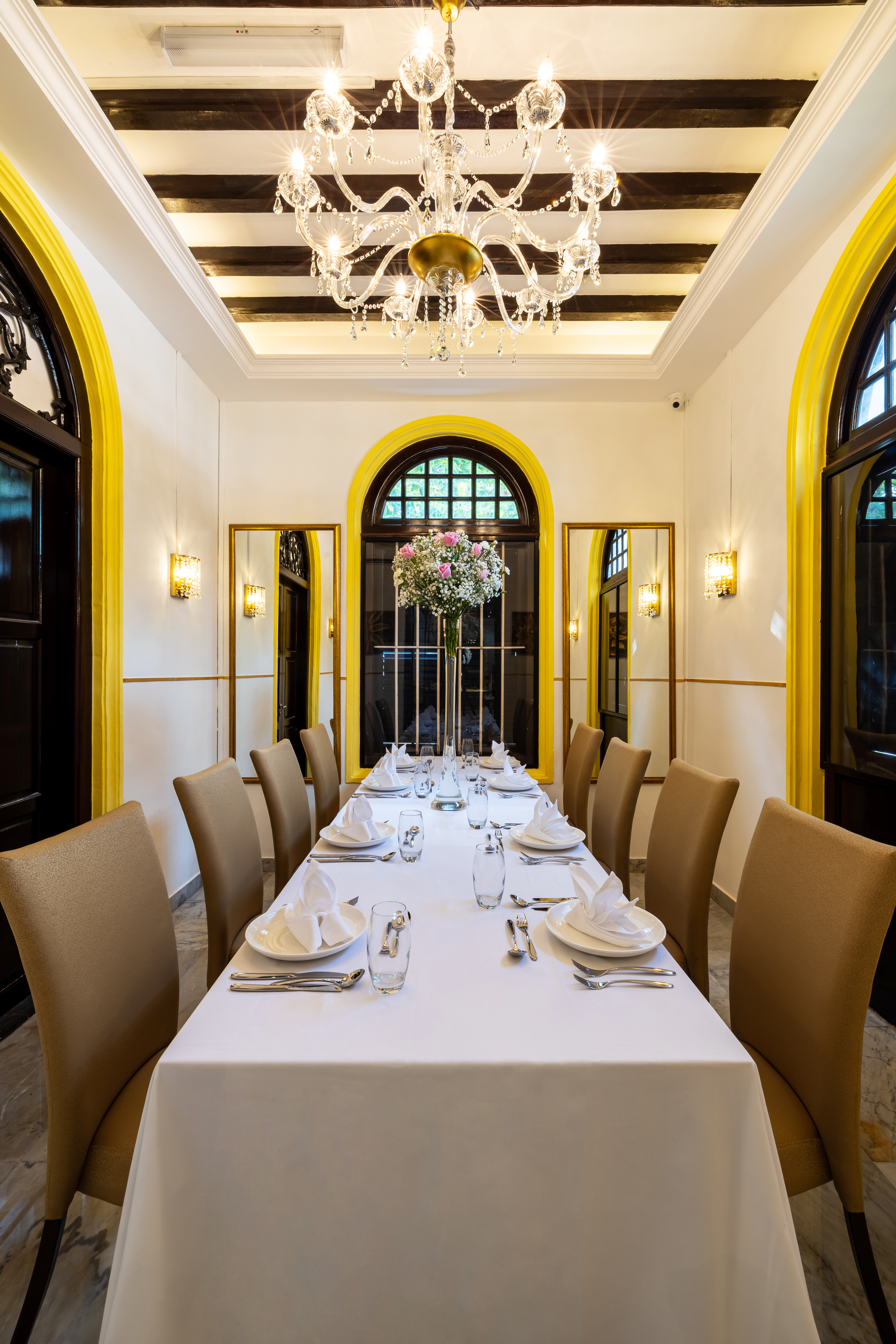
Private Room at Gedung Kuning

Gedung Kuning (Jawi: ڬيدوڠ كونيڠ; English for "Yellow Mansion") is a Malay historical residence in Singapore. Located at 73 Sultan Gate, Gedung Kuning stands just outside the Malay Heritage Centre, near Masjid Sultan in the historic district of Kampong Glam in Singapore. However, from 1919 to 1925, the Gedung Kuning's address was 33 Sultan Gate. Once forming an annexe to the adjacent palace of Singapore's Malay rulers, Istana Kampong Glam, it became the private residence of Haji Yusoff, a prominent Malayo-Javanese merchant and four generations of his family. Together with the Istana, the compound was refurbished as part of the development of the Malay Heritage Centre in 2004.

== History ==
Circa 1850s: Even though Singapore never had a Bendahara (Prime Minister), a Rumah Bendahara (House of the Prime Minister) was built for Tengku Mahmud, the younger son of Sultan Ali of Johor. It was built around the 1840s – 1850s, after Istana Kampong Glam was rebuilt by Sultan Ali of Johor. In 1864, Tengku Mahmud named the mansion Gedung Kuning (the Yellow Mansion) after its yellow walls. It is probably painted yellow as a signifier of a royal house.

1897: Due to a succession dispute, on 23 December 1897, the Court of Appeal of the Colony decided that no one could claim the estate and now, it belonged to the Crown.

1907: A Statutory Land Grant was issued when one of Sultan Ali's sons, Tungku Mohamed mortgaged the house to R.M.P.S Annamalay Chitty on 25 January 1907.

30 July 1912: Haji Yusoff bin Haji Mohamed Noor (also known as Hadjee Eusope Bin Hadjee Mohamed Noor) bought Gedung Kuning from R.M.P.C Mootiah Chitty.*

2 May 1919: During the period of 6 years, a series of Chinese families took turns having ownership of the house starting with Choo Saw San in 1919 and ended with Majoor Oei Tiong Ham after his death in 1924.

28 July 1925: Haji Yusoff bought Gedung Kuning back from Oei Tjong Swan, the son of Oei Tiong Ham in 1925. Rumour had it that the Chinese families were often plagued with personal misfortune during their stint in Gedung Kuning as well as after they sold the house

1925 - 1999: Four generations of Haji Yusoff's family stayed in Gedung Kuning from 1925 to 1999.

12 March 1999: Government announced plans to convert the Istana Kampong Glam and Gedung Kuning into a part of the Malay Heritage Centre. Istana Kampung Gelam will be turned into a museum whereas Gedung Kuning will be turned into a gallery cafe.

11 September 1999: Gedung Kuning was acquired under the Land Acquisition Act and now belonged to the Singapore Government. Haji Yusoff's descendants who were staying in Gedung Kuning had to leave the mansion.

1999 - 2003: Gedung Kuning underwent restoration.

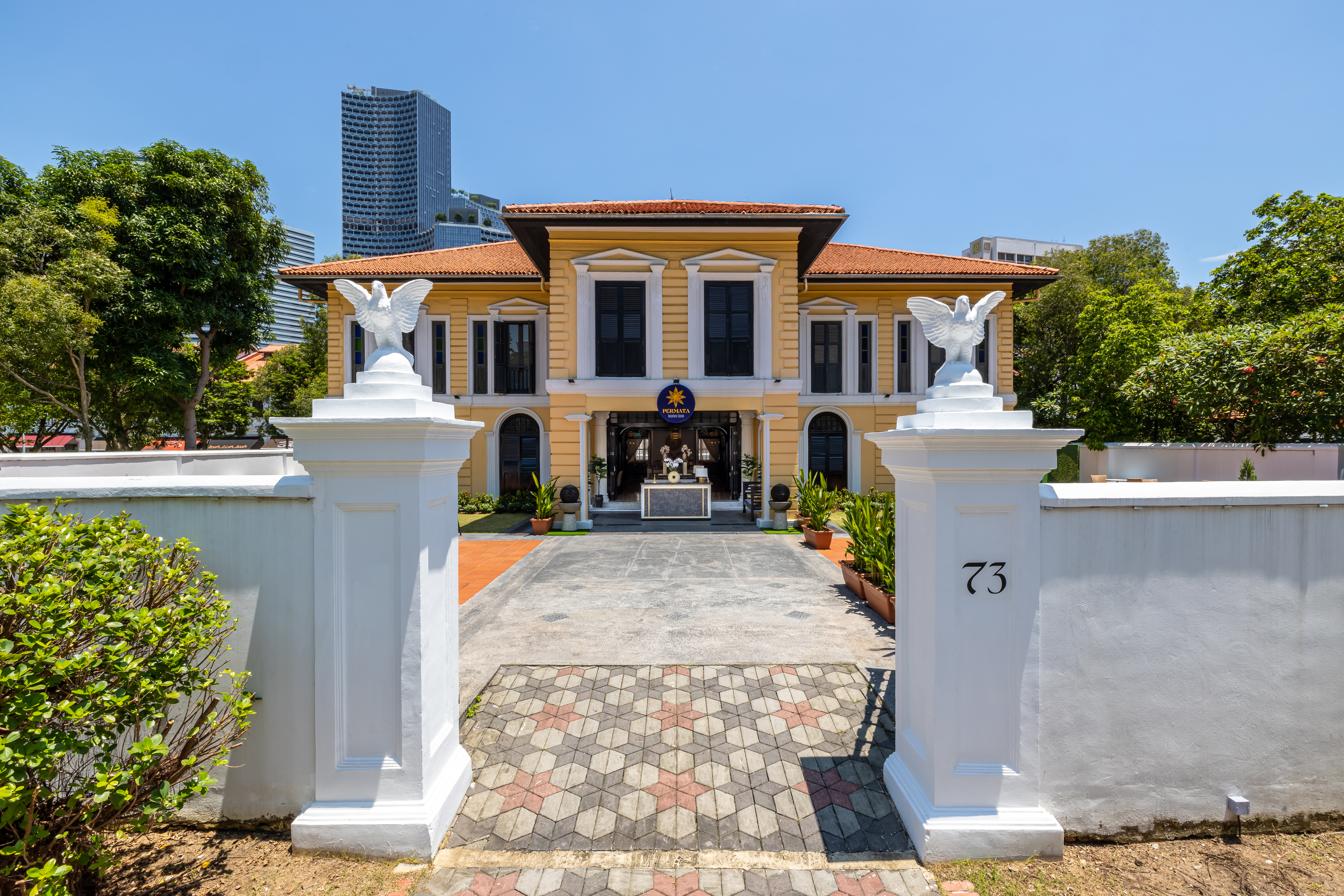
Gedung Kuning 2021 - Permata Singapore

27 Dec 2003: Restoran Tepak Sireh at Gedung Kuning was officially opened by Associate Professor Yaacob Ibrahim, Minister in-charge of Muslim Affairs.

2008: The Malay Heritage Centre came under the charge of the National Heritage Board.

August 2011: The Malay Heritage Centre closed for extensive renovation and is scheduled to open in June 2012.

1 January 2012: Restoran Tepak Sireh's lease ended. The National Heritage Board evaluated tenders for new business at Gedung Kuning.

September 2012: A new semi-fine dining Malay restaurant Mamanda was opened at Gedung Kuning in September 2012.

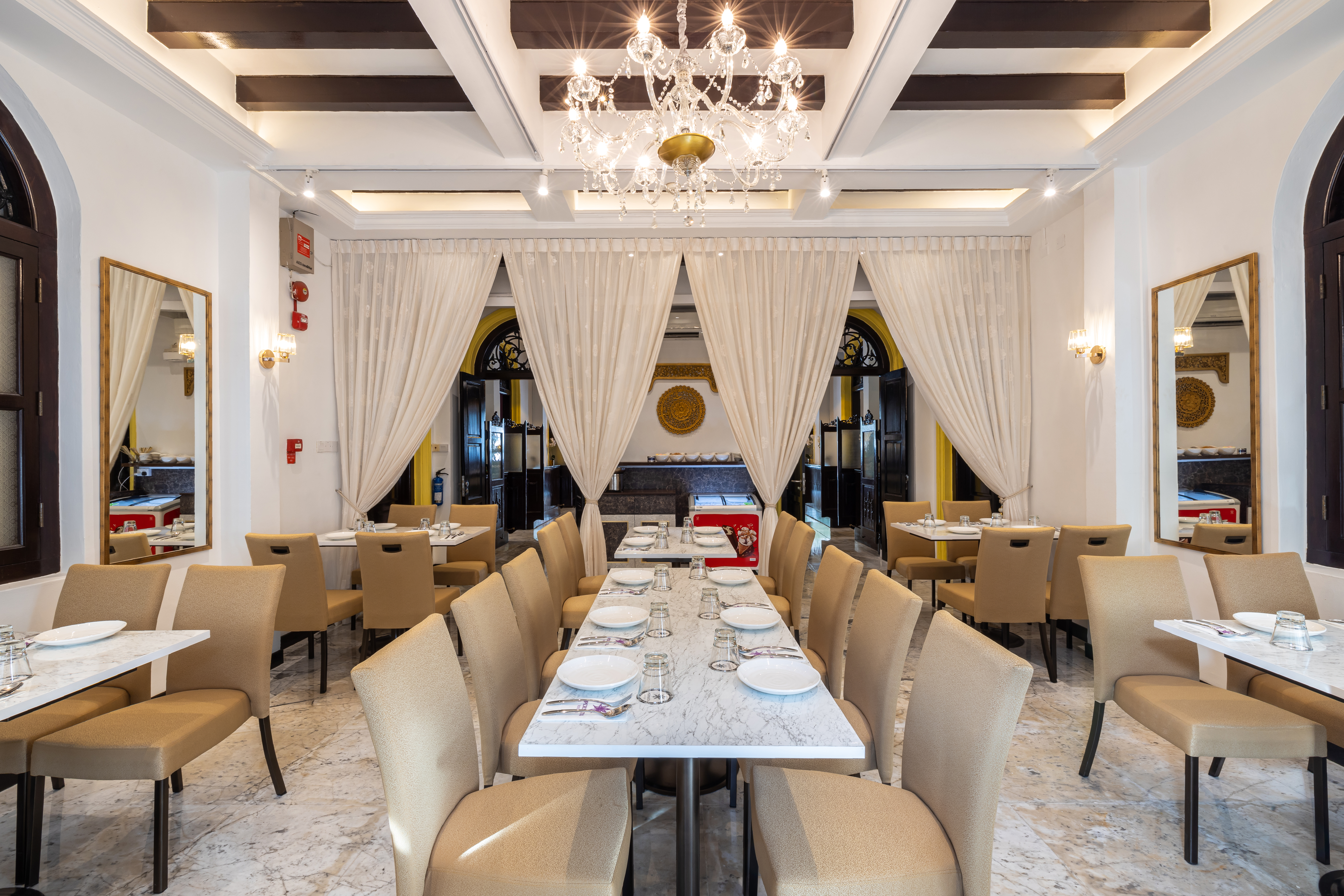
Gedung Kuning - Main Dining Hall - Permata Singapore

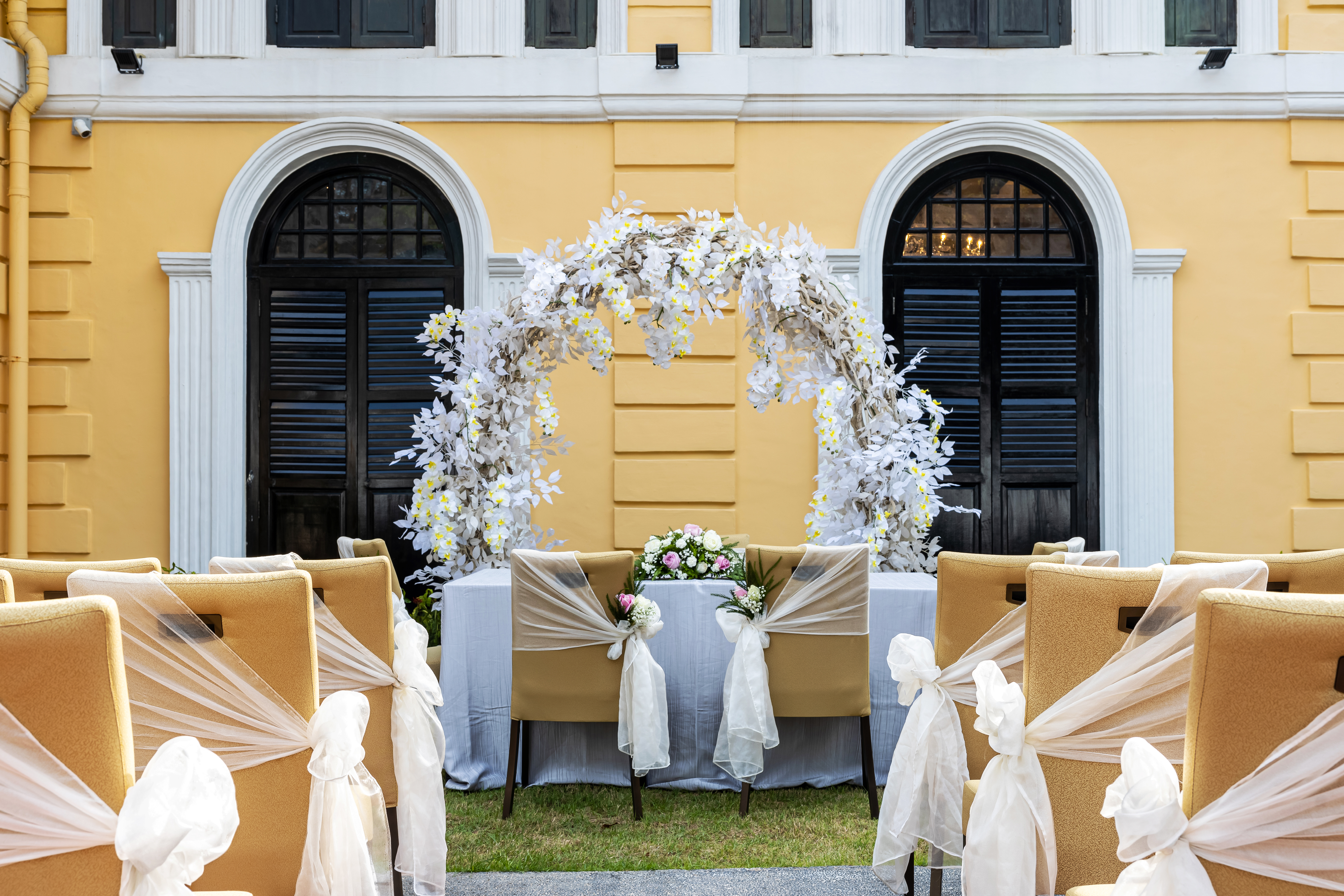
Outdoor Wedding - Permata Singapore at Gedung Kuning

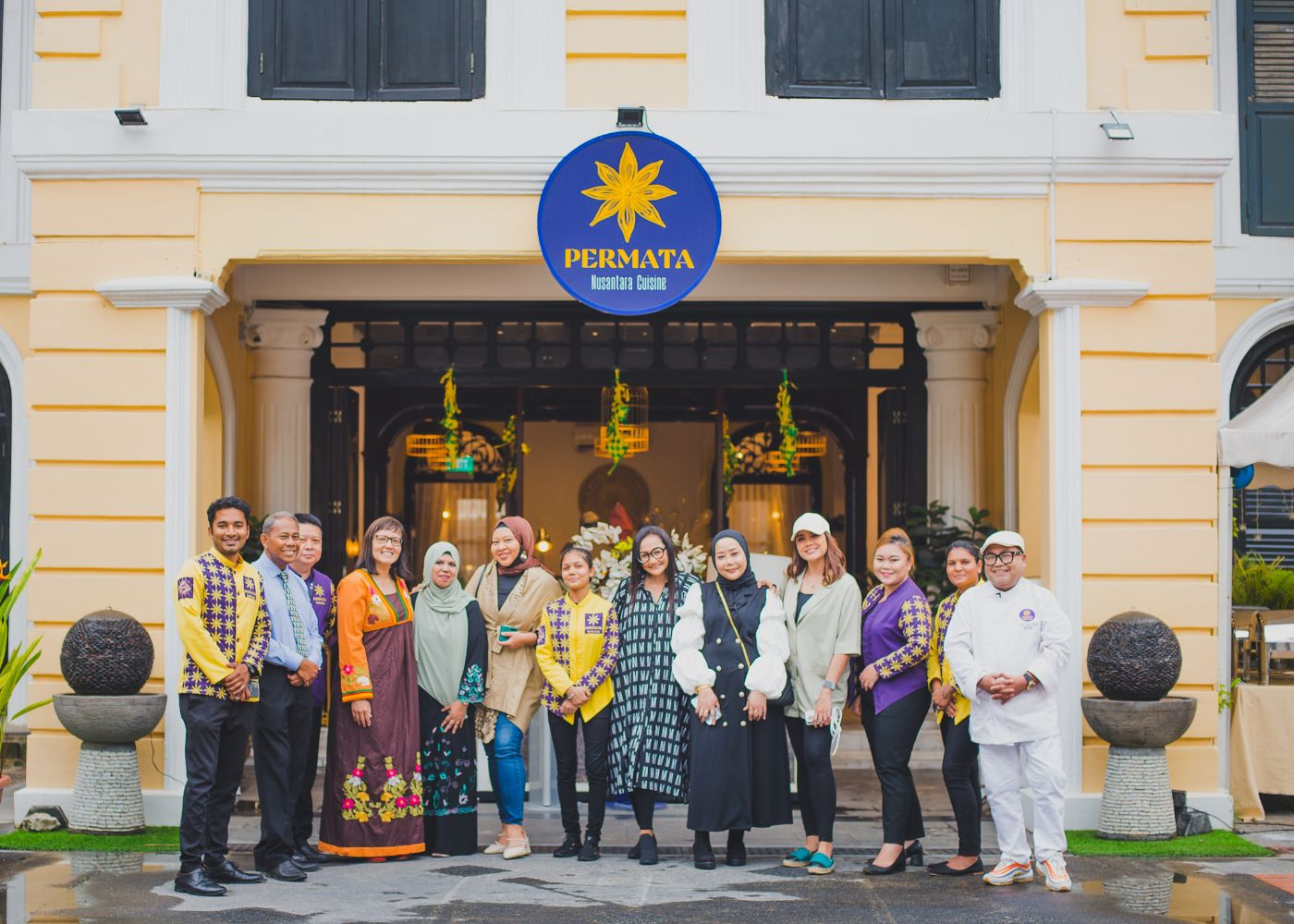
Celebrity Chef Mel Dean and local Singapore celebrity breaking fast during Ramadan 2023 at Permata Singapore

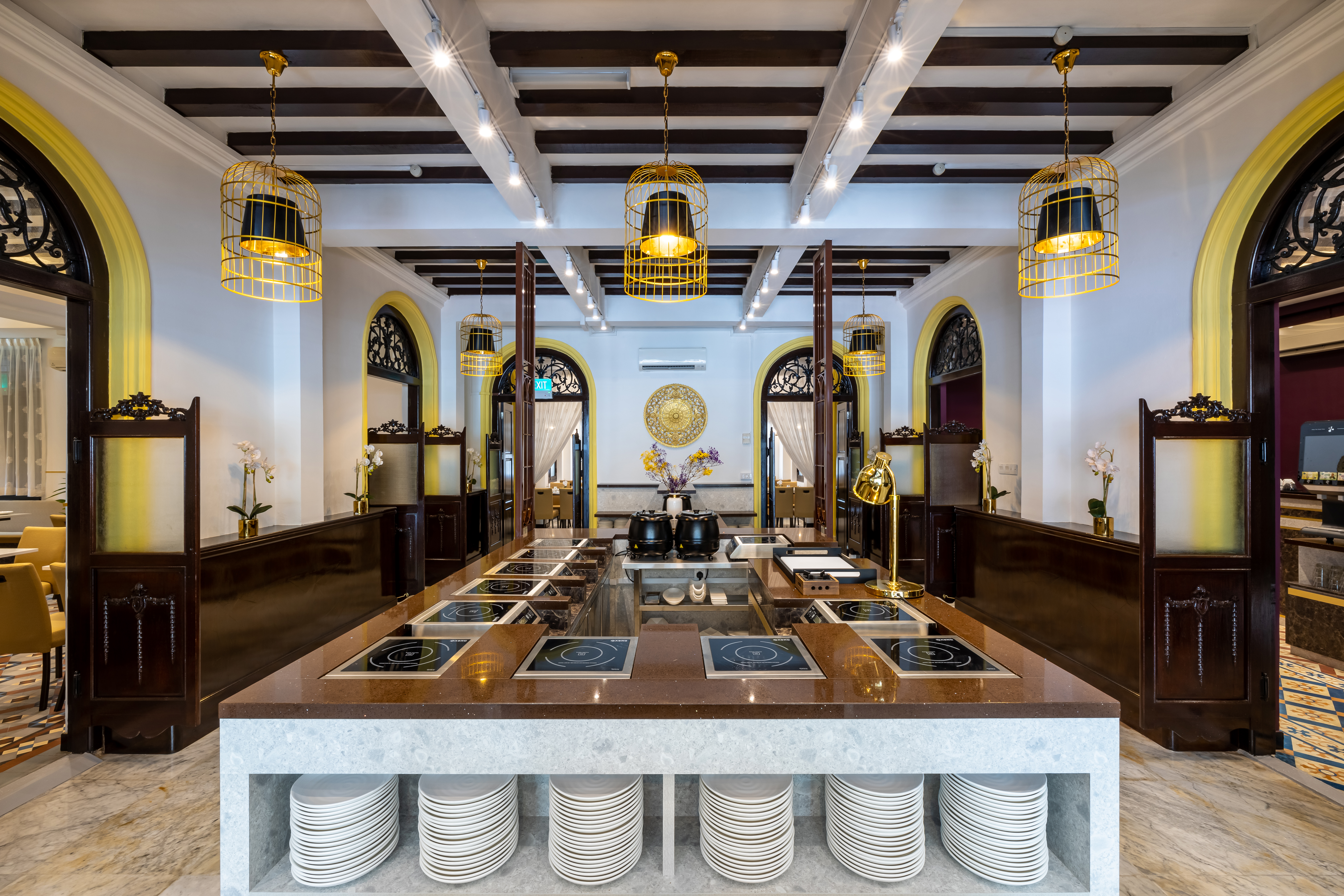
Halal Buffet restaurant - Permata Singapore at Gedung Kuning

April 2019: The Mamanda restaurant closed in April 2019 after its lease was terminated by the Malay Heritage Foundation (MHF).

October 2019: The escape rooms operator Amazing Chambers Singapura, with themes based on Singapore's histories and legends, was opened in October 2019.

23 April 2021: A new halal buffet restaurant Permata specialised in progressive Nusantara cuisine was opened on 23 April 2021. The restaurant's name, Permata means "jewel" in Malay, inspired by the gemstone trade that took place in the area in the 1920s. Led by a local celebrity Chef, Mel Dean, Permata offers a modern take on Nusantara cuisine, showcasing the diverse and indigenous flavours of the region from Indonesia, Singapore, Malaysia, Brunei, Thailand and Beyond.

30 April 2022: Gedung Kuning with more than 10,000 square feet and various private rooms hosts many different types of events such as weddings, catering orders, and private events in the VIP room. Permata's Singapore halal buffet menu is also available for private events. This royal yellow mansion at Kampong Glam has hosted many delegates and diplomatic events, company dinners and weddings.

== Architectural Features of Gedung Kuning ==
Gedung Kuning was built in the 1850s with similar elements as the shophouse. The main key elements of a shophouse, which the Urban Redevelopment Authority sees as the most important are roofs, foundation, party walls, timber beams & joist, airwells, rear court, windows, doors, staircase, façade and the forecourts’ wall and gate. Gedung Kuning's main structure consist a mixture of timber framing for the roof and load-bearing walls.

=== Foundations ===
Gedung Kuning is presumably built on pad foundations made of mass masonry. If it was built on a strip foundation, it will run underneath and support the load-bearing walls. Pad foundation made of mass masonry typically consists of several layers of bricks where the lowest layer is usually twice the breadth of the wall above and the total height of the footings is about twoIthirds of the breadth of the wall. Masonry foundations were usually made from 75 x 215 x 100 mm burnt clay bricks bonded together with lime mortar, which makes it porous and less rigid, giving the foundation more tolerance to differential settlement as compared to cement mortar. As a result, the building will not have much cracks or fissures over the years, as the case of Gedung Kuning. However, the columns along Kandahar Street were built out of pad foundations made out of reinforced concrete.

=== Load-bearing walls ===
Gedung Kuning is built primarily on a load-bearing wall. The wall bears the weight of the house and transfers the load to the foundation structure. This is similar to the party walls in a shophouse. The load-bearing walls demarcate each room of Gedung Kuning as how party walls demarcate each shophouse. As party walls are also known as firewalls, the load-bearing walls of Gedung Kuning serve similar functions by creating a barrier and preventing the spread of fire between or through each rooms. A party wall is usually extended above the roof level to ensure its effectiveness but this does not exist in Gedung Kuning as it is a standalone house. However, this idea is evident on the Gedung Kuning's walkway on Kandahar Street when the boundary wall is extended onto the walkway. This is probably erected to prevent the spread of fire between Gedung Kuning and the former Kota Raja Club. The walls of Gedung Kuning are constructed using brickwork construction method and plastered for a smooth finish and painted over. The wall has a uniform thickness throughout the two levels. The load-bearing walls are supported on the foundation. There are several non-structural wall used to partition room. Usually, the load-bearing walls are supported on a continuous strip foundation while a column rests on brick footings, which were in turn supported on bakau (mangrove) timber piles. Lime mortar is usually used in the construction of the brickwork in early buildings and due to the damp evaporation ability, which slows down the proliferation of the spalling of surface finishes, such as plaster and paintwork, caused by accumulated damp inside the structural element as compared to cement mortar used in later construction.

=== Columns & Arches ===
There are several columns in Gedung Kuning especially on the side of the house facing Kandahar Street. In the context of a shophouse, columns are usually found on the front of the building forming the fiveI footway. The columns in Gedung Kuning placed along Kandahar Street formed the fiveIfootway colonnade while supporting the upper floor verandah. The columns of early shophouse are made out of brick piers but for Gedung Kuning, it is made out of concrete. Columns also appear on the second storey façade of the verandah and the Corinthian pilaster accentuated the columns. In addition to that, there are two Ionic columns that exist on the side of the house facing Sultan Gate. The Ionic columns are not load-bearing as it does not align with the grid of the load-bearing wall. The application of Classical order is correct in terms of the accordance with Roman preferences but it is missing the Doric order. Arches exist on Gedung Kuning on Kandahar Street between two columns. However, arches are not a common feature in the neighboring shophouses. Arches contribute to the streetscape by accentuating the rhythmic progression of the five-footway. The arches also exist on the carport of the house.

=== Five-Footway ===
Five-footways are continuous colonnade covered walkways running the length of the fronts or sides of shophouse blocks and integral to the shophouse structure. Five-footways exist for a limited length of 11.17 metres on the side of Gedung Kuning facing Kandahar Street under the house's verandah only. The areas after those are exposed to the elements. The walkways only exist in front of the house. It ended with the party walls blocking the walkway. The walls and columns are plastered and painted. The fiveIfootways are now paved with modern tiles. However, previously, it was probably paved with terracotta tiles, waxed cement screed, granite slabs or a combination of materials.

=== Beams and Joists ===
Beams and joist are horizontal structural members that distribute the dead and live load from the upper floors to the load-bearing walls. The beams and joist in Gedung Kuning are made out of timber because it was a readily available material back then. It is often made of Chengal, a hardwood that is resistant to the dead load transferred from the upper floors. It is an economical material as it could be sourced locally and has enough tensile strength to carry lateral loads. Main timber beams, which are key horizontal structural members, are parallel to Kandahar Street & Sultan Gate road and span between the walls. However, there are beams and joist that run in the perpendicular direction. Those beams are usually located in the outdoor spaces such as the fiveIfootway. This suggests that the direction of beams might indicate spaces that are outdoors and public, and spaces that are more private. The beams and joist rest on ledges where the wall diminish in thickness and act as a load-bearing surface. I-beams have been introduced into structures to replace rotten timber beams but in Gedung Kuning, it is used to support the current beams. Exposed IIbeams have to be encased in concrete for fire safety as well as aesthetics reasons. Reinforced concrete beams are used to support the upper storey of the five-footway.

=== Floors ===
The first storey floor of the Gedung Kuning is probably made of concrete and finished in a variety of materials from granite, decorative floor tiles to terracotta tiles. Often, like in the shophouse, the more impermeable materials such as granite are used in outdoor spaces and terracotta tiles for five-footway. The decorative floor tiles in octagonal shaped have floral patterns in the form of a geometric eight-petalled flowers. The tiles are similar to the tiles of European origins found in an advertisement in 1912 catalogue.

The upper floors with the exception of the toilet and service wet areas are made out of timber boarding supported on timber floor joist. Timber floorboards are thin horizontal structural members laid horizontally on the floor joist and joined to one another by the traditional tongue and groove method. The timber floor joists and floorboards used to be exposed and constitute the ceiling of the room below. The floorboards are now covered with concrete for fire safety reasons. The floor joists are beveled and moulded.

=== Roofs ===
The roof of Gedung Kuning is a pitched hipped roof and covered with overlapping and interlocking unglazed terracotta clay tiles that are VIprofiled and arranged in characteristics ridge and furrow fashion in one or more layers as required while being laid on timber battens. The means of bonding between the tiles is mortar and the entire roof finish is supported on timber roof members. The purlins span the load-bearing walls and transmitting the weight of the roof onto the load-bearing walls. Rafters are inclined structural members supporting the pitched roofs supported by purlins and roof beams. The eaves are broad and they overhang. The soffit of the eaves of the roof is covered with timber paneling. They are made of readily available timber (economical materials) that could be sourced locally and have enough tensile strength to carry lateral loads.

Waterproofing usually includes the use of bituminous asphalt, galvanized iron flashing, copings and a layer of corrugated metal roofing under the tiles. Although tarpaulin sheets and other waterproofing membranes can be commonly found spread over tile roofs and weighed down by bricks or timber members as an expedient measures. Galvanized iron gutters and downpipes complete the water removal system of traditional roofs. Water from the roofs are eventually drained off to the open surface drains.

=== Corbels ===
Corbels are short cantilevering beams or projections that serve to facilitate the connection of beams with columns. They are usually made of timber, granite or concrete and ornamented with carvings or mouldings and occasionally are part of the overall ornamentation of the columns and beams. In Gedung Kuning, they are physically small in size and made out of concrete or plaster but their absence would be a significant departure from the original expression of the house and without them, the junction between the beam and columns would appear incomplete.

=== Stairs ===
The staircases are constructed of timber and are an internal element. The staircases are modified to the present stairs of 175mm risers and 220mm thread. The staircases have timber handrails and simple banisters are made of polished hardwood, which are free standing as balustrades. The staircase arrangement is straight with an elevated base landing. The first few steps are made out of brick foundation but now in reinforced concrete. This was done to prevent them from coming into contact with the wet floors .

== See also ==
- Kampong Glam
- Istana Kampong Glam
