= Bussorah Street =

Street in Kampong Glam, Singapore

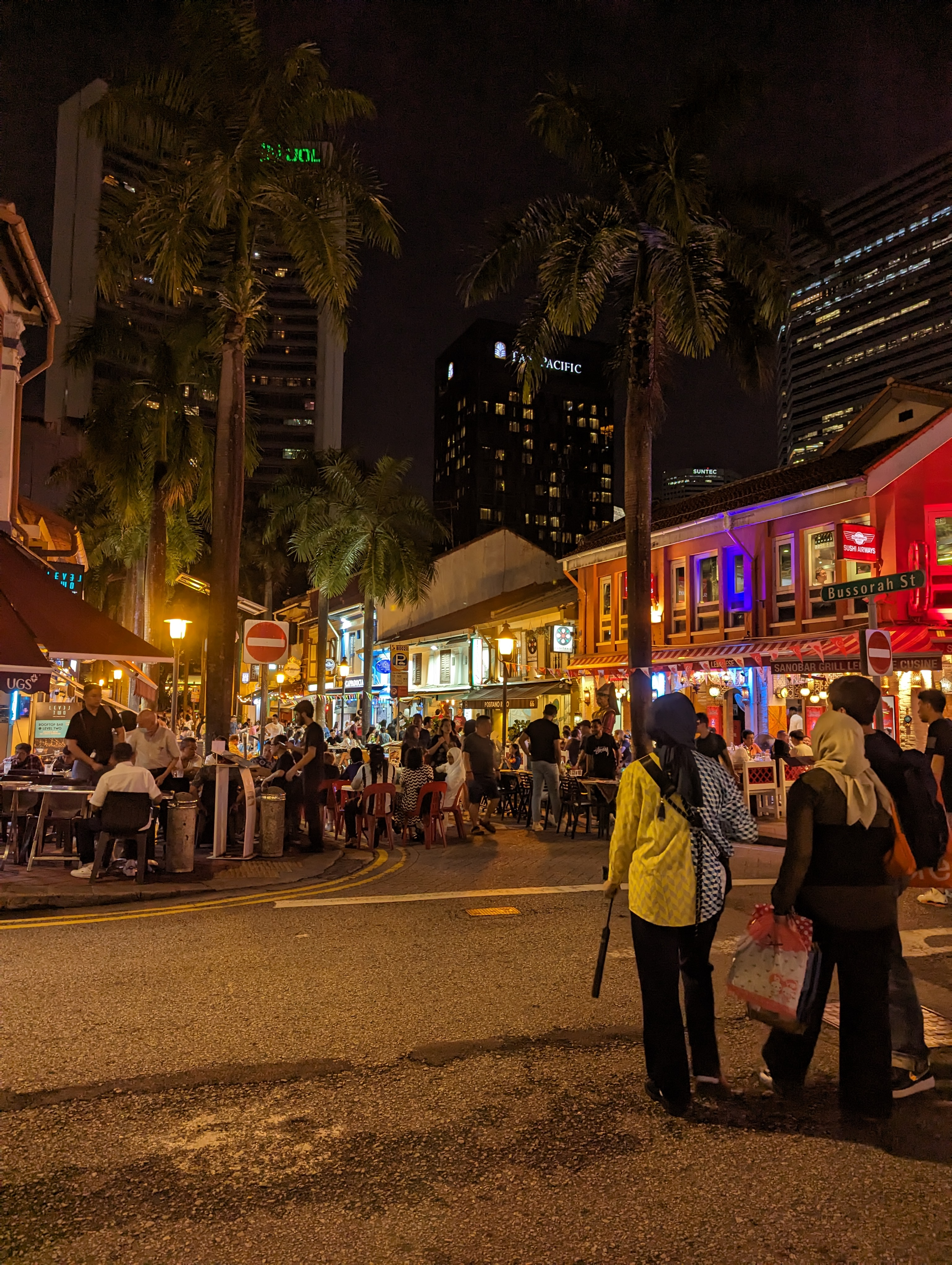
Bussorah Street at night bustling with people

Bussorah Street is situated in the Kampong Kampong Glam area of Singapore. The street is named after the Iraqi city of Bussorah (now named Basra) and features a collection of Middle Eastern restaurants and tourist shops.

== History ==
Bussorah Street was previously known as Kampong Kaji (Pilgrim Village) and Kampong Tembaga (Copper Village).
