= Istana Kampong Glam =

Former palace in Singapore

- Istana Kampong Gelam
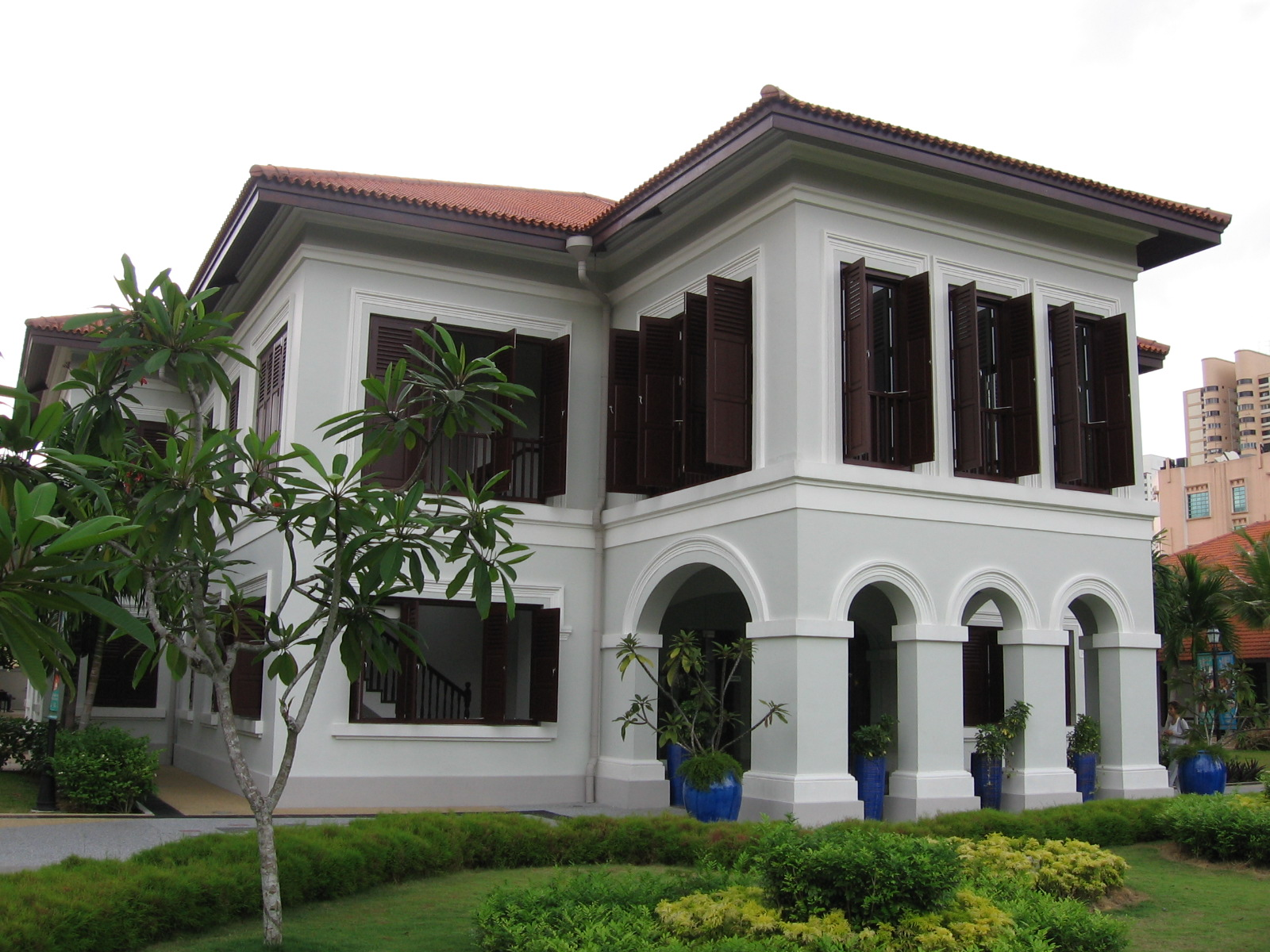
- Istana Kampong Glam, currently occupied by the Malay Heritage Centre

- Location within Singapore

General information
- Status: Completed
- Type: Palace
- Architectural style: Palladian
- Location: Kampong Glam, Singapore, 85 Sultan Gate, Singapore 198501, Singapore
- Coordinates: 1.3029°N 103.85988°E
- Current tenants: Malay Heritage Centre
- Construction started: 1836; 190 years ago
- Completed: 1843; 183 years ago
- Renovated: 2004; 22 years ago
- Owner: Government of Singapore

Technical details
- Floor count: 2

Design and construction
- Architect: Believed to be George Drumgoole Coleman

National monument of Singapore
- Designated: 6 August 2015; 10 years ago
- Reference no.: 70

Istana Kampong Glam (Malay for "Kampong Glam Palace"; Jawi: ايستان کامڤوڠ ڬلم), also Istana Kampong Gelam, is a former Malay palace in Singapore. It is located near Masjid Sultan in Kampong Glam. The palace and compounds were refurbished into the Malay Heritage Centre in 2004. The palace was gazetted as a national monument on the eve of Singapore's Golden Jubilee, on 6 August 2015.

== History ==
=== Early days ===
The original Istana Kampong Glam was built by Sultan Hussein Shah of Johor in 1819 on land of about 23 hectares (57 acres) in Kampong Glam that had been given to him by the British East India Company. It is believed to have been a wooden structure in the area to the east of Beach Road. When it was completed, it occupied an area twice the size of the present compound, which was reduced in 1824 for the construction of North Bridge Road. The Sultan lived there until he moved to Malacca in 1834.

=== Rebuilding ===
The concrete structure that exists today was commissioned by Sultan Hussein's eldest son, Sultan Ali Iskandar Shah of Johor-Riau in 1835. It was built on the site of the original building between 1836 and 1843. The new two-storey palace is believed to have been designed by colonial architect George Drumgoole Coleman as some of its architectural features are similar to those of other buildings Coleman designed, although there is no definitive evidence that it was designed by him. Its design is a combination of the Palladian style, which was then popular in England, with traditional Malay motifs. The extensive compound of the Istana was enclosed by a perimeter wall, and small kampong-style houses were built around it for the Sultan's kin, servants and artisans.

After the completion of the Istana in 1843, Tengku Alam, Sultan Ali's eldest son, lived in it until his death in 1891. Leases of portions of the land on which the palace stood had been granted by Sultan Ali, and Tengku Alam continued to collect rents and supported the members of his father's family according to Malay custom. After his death he was buried in the royal grave at the nearby Sultan Mosque.

In 2026, the discovery of a stencilled sign and an 1891 newspaper article hints that the rebuilding of the Istana might only have been completed in 1890, a year before Tengku Alam's passing. Further testing of the building's age is pending.

=== Succession dispute ===
In 1896, there was a succession dispute in Sultan Hussein's family over rights to the Kampong Glam estate, and the matter went to court. In 1897, the court ruled that no one could rightfully claim to be the successor of the Sultan and that the estate belonged to the Crown. The estate became state land when Singapore gained independence.

In 1904, the Sultan Hussein Ordinance was enacted to provide the descendants of Sultan Hussein with income derived from the Kampong Glam estate. The amount was capped at S$250,000 in 1991, revised by the government in 1999. Under the new scheme, the beneficiaries could opt either for a share of S$350,000 a year for 30 years or for a lump sum payment.

Residents still living in the Istana were resettled, as the building was to undergo conservation works. Until that time, the Istana had been the private residence for the Sultan's descendants.

=== Restoration ===
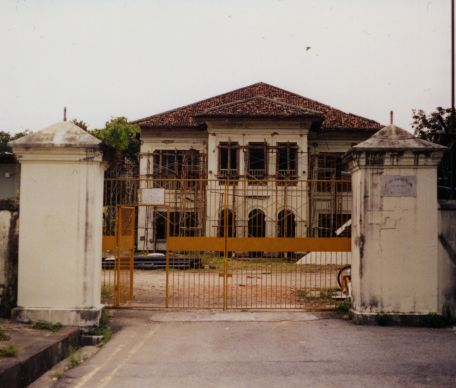
Istana Kampong Glam right before restoration in August 2001

The Istana Kampong Glam and compounds were refurbished as part of the development of the Malay Heritage Centre in 2004. The Istana has been faithfully restored according to Coleman's design with special emphasis on its setting, retaining the compound, its walled enclosure and the road leading to the building. Timber and cement were used to replicate the interior flooring of the former building.

=== National Monument ===
The Istana Kampong Gelam was gazetted on 6 August 2015, the eve of Singapore's Golden Jubilee weekend, as a national monument.
