= Haji Lane =

Lane in Kampong Glam, Singapore

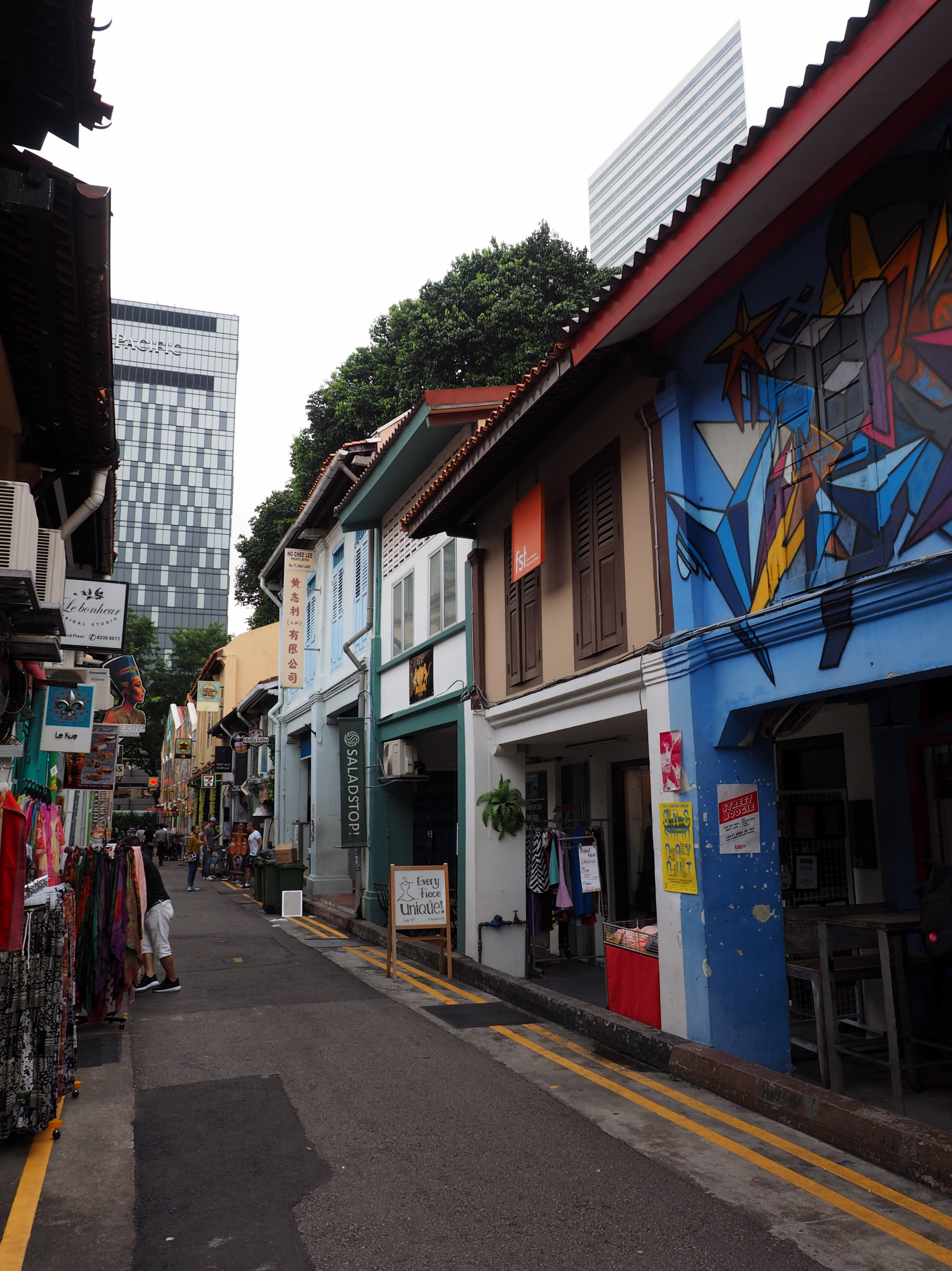
Part of Haji Lane in 2016

Haji Lane is a street in the Kampong Glam neighbourhood of Singapore. Young people frequent the shophouses along this lane for the independent stores and cafes, such as Pizza Fabbrica, Good Luck Beerhouse, and Monocle.

Haji Lane derived its name from the businesses on the street. There were many Arab pilgrim-brokers who would arrange the haj for Muslims in Singapore and from the nearby islands such as Java.

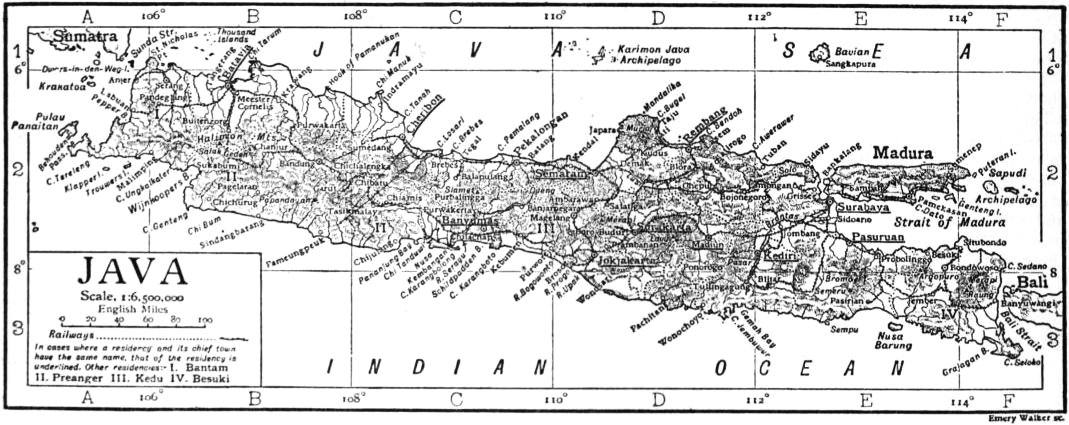
Map of Tanah Jawa

== History ==
1800s-1960s: The shophouses of Haji were most commonly used as lodges for Hajj pilgrims whilst on their journeys. During their stay, the pilgrims would work close by as hawkers in order to save enough money to continue the rest of their journeys.

1960s-1970s: Haji Lane provided shophouse homes for poorer Malay families.

After 1970s: There were a lot of empty shophouses. The ones that were occupied were used as storage spaces.

== Gallery ==
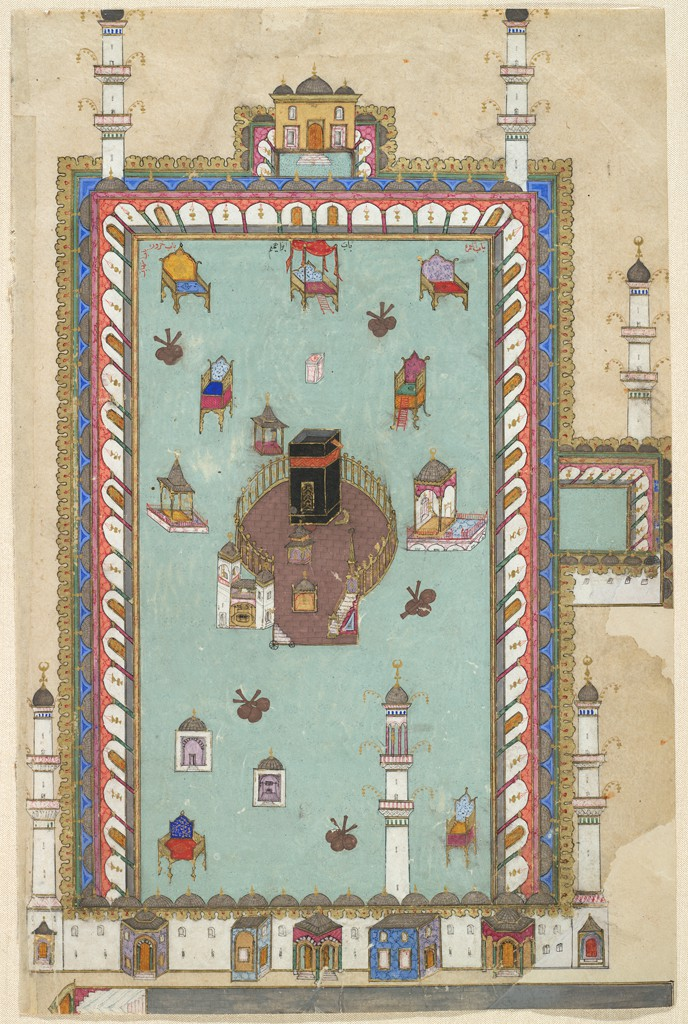
Uthmaniyah scatch of Masjidil Haram Makkah

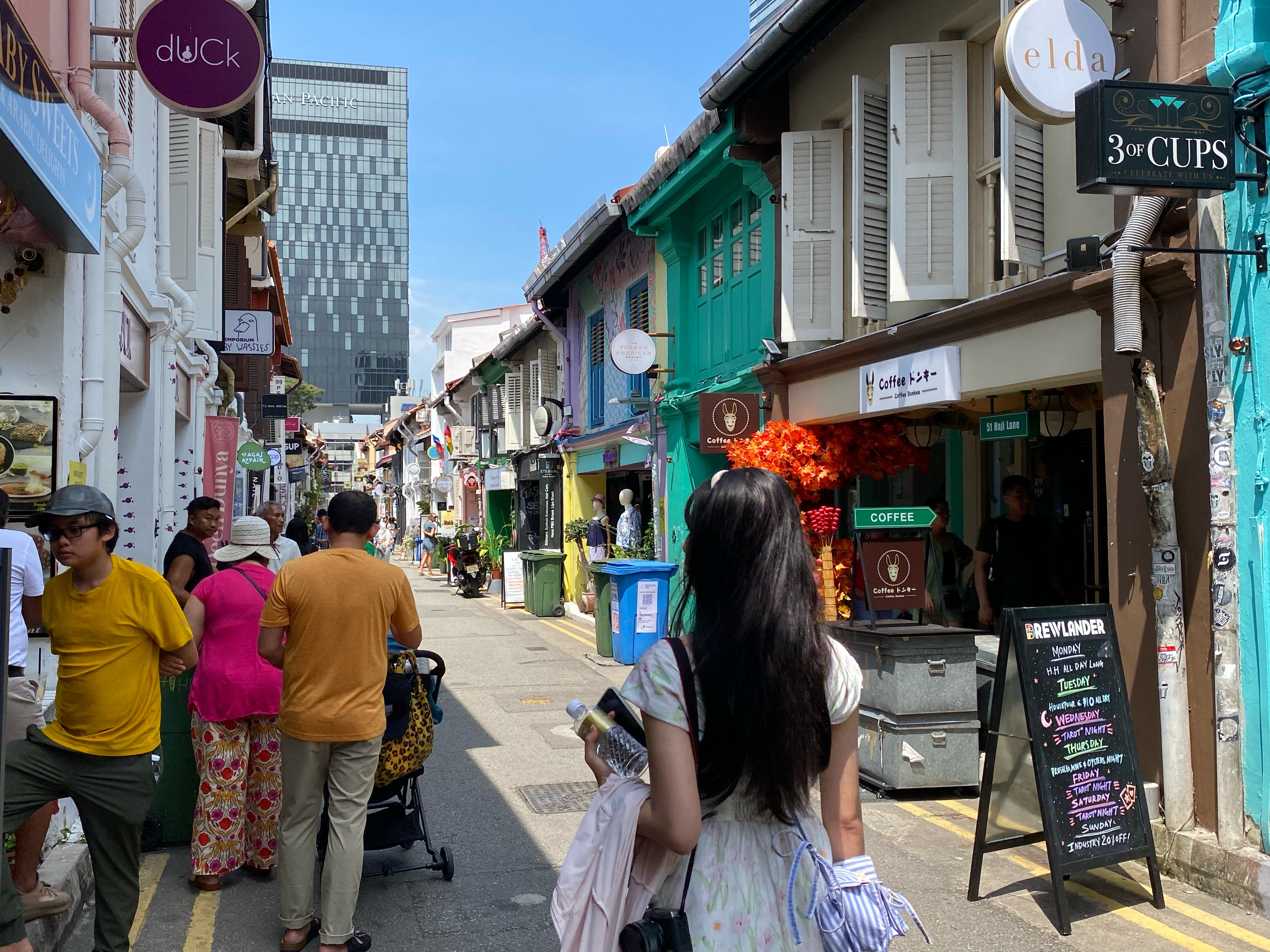

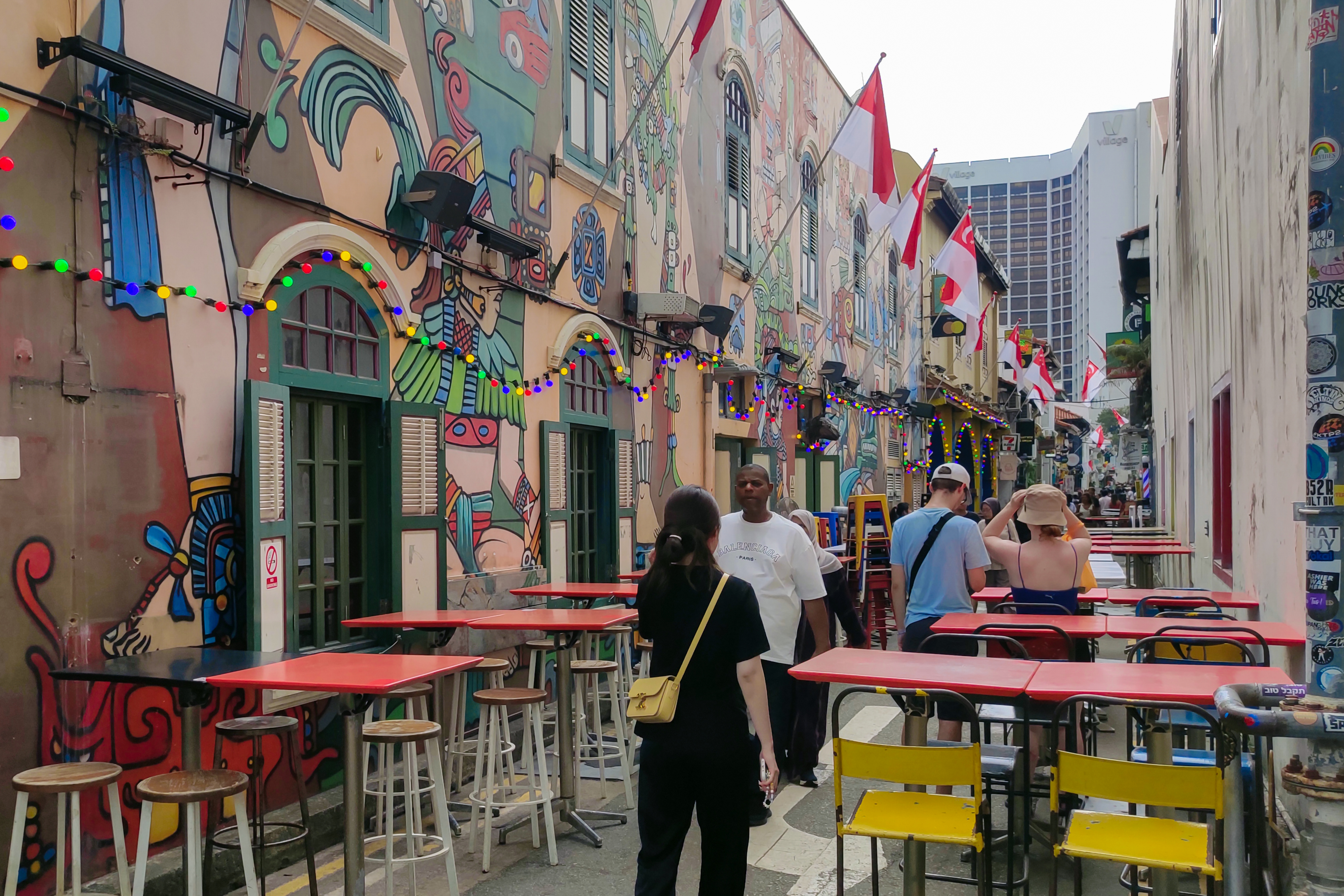
