= Malay Heritage Centre =

Museum in Sultan Gate, Singapore

Malay Heritage Centre تامن واريثن ملايو
- Taman Warisan Melayu

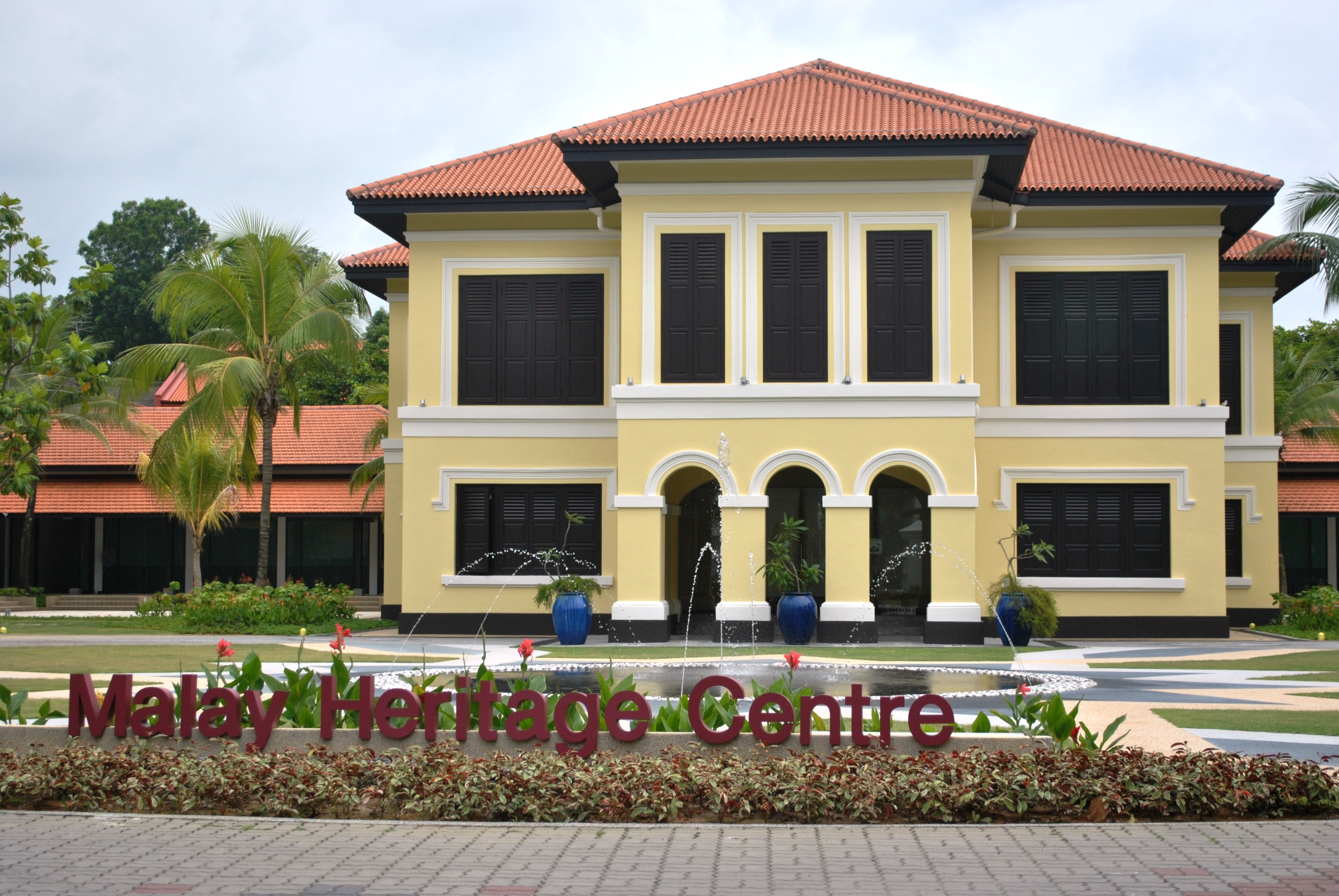
- The Malay Heritage Centre in 2012

- Location within Singapore
- Established: 4 June 2005; 21 years ago
- Location: 85 Sultan Gate, Singapore 198501
- Coordinates: 1°18′08″N 103°51′37″E
- Type: History museum
- Chairperson: Norshahril Saat
- Website: www.malayheritage.org.sg

The Malay Heritage Centre (Malay: Taman Warisan Melayu; Jawi: تامن واريثن ملايو) is a cultural centre and museum located at Sultan Gate off Beach Road in Kampong Glam, Singapore. Situated inside a gazetted national monument, the Istana Kampong Glam, its primary focus is to showcase the heritage and history of Malay Singaporeans.

== History ==
=== Istana Kampong Glam ===
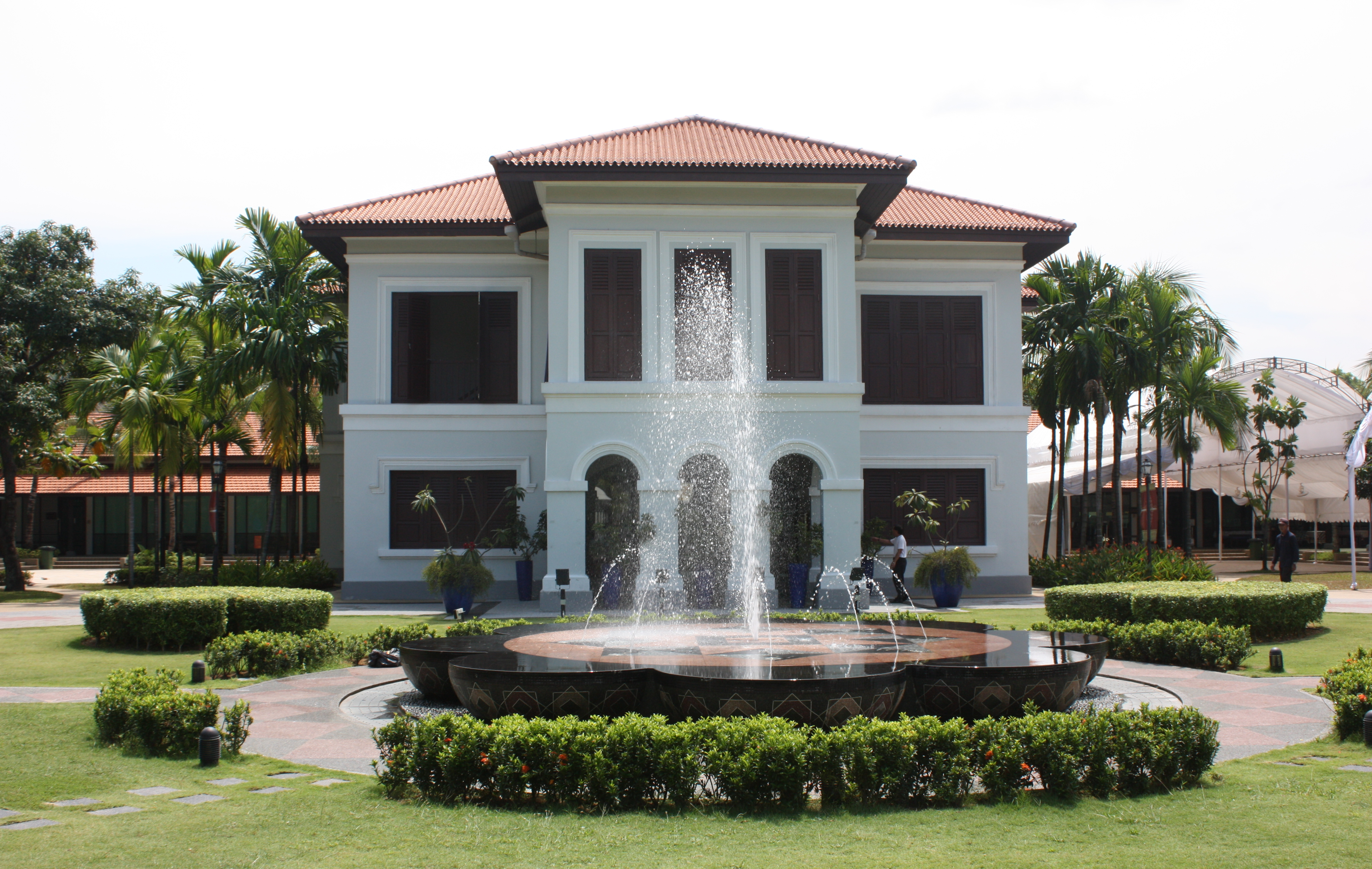
The Istana Kampong Glam, which the museum is located in, 2009.

In 1824, British colonial officer Sir Stamford Raffles gave Sultan Hussein Shah of Johor a vast 56 acres (23 ha) expanse in Kampong Glam, which became the land that the Istana Kampong Glam would occupy. In the 1840s, Sultan Ali Iskandar Shah, son of Sultan Hussein Shah, hired George Drumgoole Coleman to build the Istana there. Coleman reflected a blend of Palladian architectural elements with indigenous Malay motifs. The 2026 discovery of a stencilled sign and an 1891 newspaper article hints that the building might only have been completed in 1890. Further testing of the building's age is pending.

Following a succession dispute in 1896, the estate transitioned to state ownership. In 2004, as an integral facet of the Malay Heritage Centre initiative, restoration efforts were undertaken.

=== Malay Heritage Centre ===
After extensive restoration efforts, the palace grounds were refurbished into the Malay Heritage Centre, officially inaugurated in June 2005 with Prime Minister Lee Hsien Loong leading the ceremony. This transformation provided a platform for visitors to engage with Singapore's diverse cultural heritage. Furthermore, during the SG50 National Day celebrations, the site received the distinction of being designated as a national monument, highlighting its importance in Singapore's historical and cultural fabric.

=== Programs and Initiatives ===
The primary focus of the centre is the preservation and display of Malay culture and heritage in Singapore. Through a collection of artifacts, multimedia presentations, diorama displays, and exhibits, visitors are offered a comprehensive exploration of Malay identity and heritage. The centre serves as an educational platform, providing insight into traditions, customs, and historical narratives, contributing to a broader understanding of Singapore's multicultural heritage.

In addition to its exhibits and displays, the Malay Heritage Centre plays an active role in organizing Malay cultural programs and workshops. These initiatives, along with other fundraising activities, historically accounted for two-thirds of the centre's operational costs until 2008. However, in a significant development, the Government of Singapore announced in 2008 its commitment to fully fund the centre with S$1.7 million annually, a notable increase from the one-third funding provided in previous years.

The Malay Heritage Centre in September 2026.

The substantial financial backing, coupled with additional support from the National Heritage Board, is anticipated to elevate the centre to the status of a museum of international standard. Furthermore, it is expected to open doors for collaborations with esteemed regional museums in Indonesia and Malaysia, fostering cross-cultural exchanges and enriching the centre's offerings on a global scale.

=== Revitalisation ===
In August 2011, the Malay Heritage Centre was closed for extensive renovations. It reopened on 1 September 2012. During the re-opening of the Malay Heritage Centre, Prime Minister Lee Hsien Loong stressed the need for its programs to engage the community and promote multicultural understanding. He emphasized reaching out to youth and other ethnic groups, integrating interactive elements, and contributing to education. The revamped centre features new permanent galleries showcasing Kampong Glam's significance as a focal point for exploring Malay history, culture, and heritage. With over 80 percent of the artefacts on display never seen before, the centre aims to provide visitors with a fresh and enriching experience. To celebrate its reopening, the centre is offering free admission for the month, coinciding with the launch of its inaugural Malay CultureFest.

The Malay Heritage Centre (MHC) ceased its operations on 30 October 2022 for a comprehensive redevelopment initiative, marking the conclusion of over a decade since its last major renovation in 2011. This closure aimed to facilitate enhancements across the Centre's facilities, content, and offerings. To commemorate this temporary cessation, the MHC hosted a month-long event titled MHC ClosingFest, inviting individuals to partake in a final celebration of local Malay culture and heritage. The Malay Heritage Centre has now officially reopened from 25 April 2026.

== Gallery ==
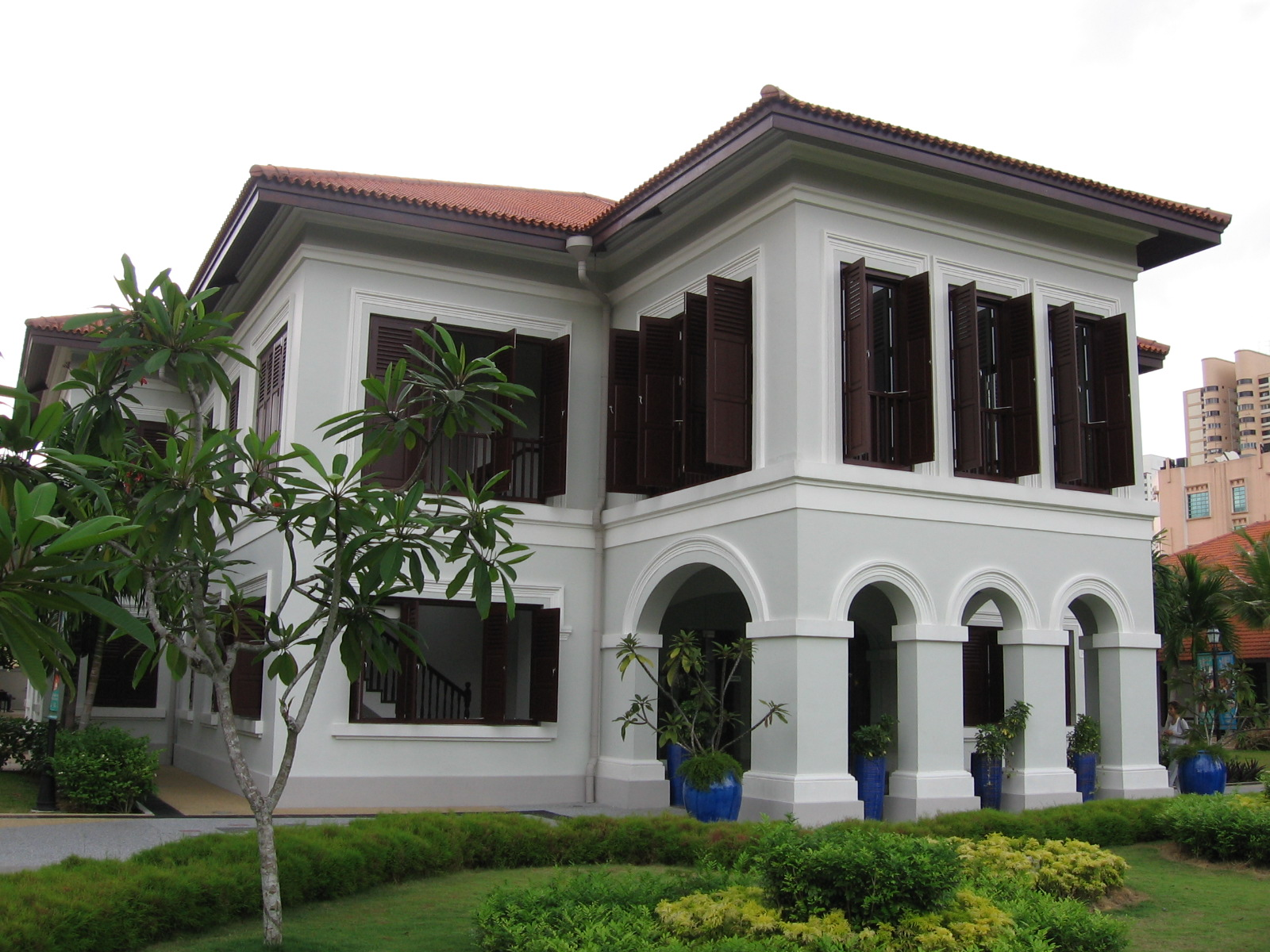
Istana Kampong Glam at the Malay Heritage Centre

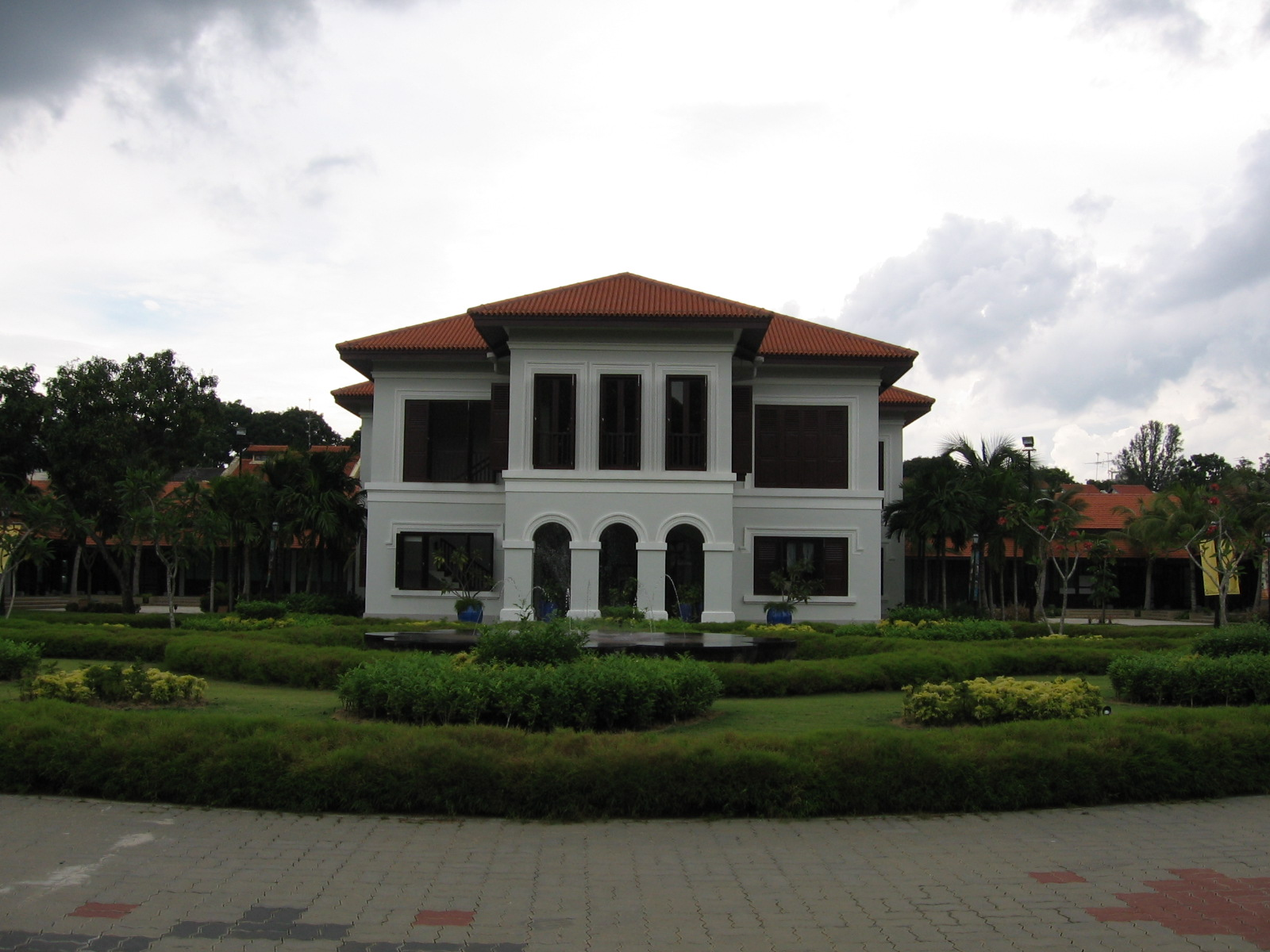
Istana Kampong Glam

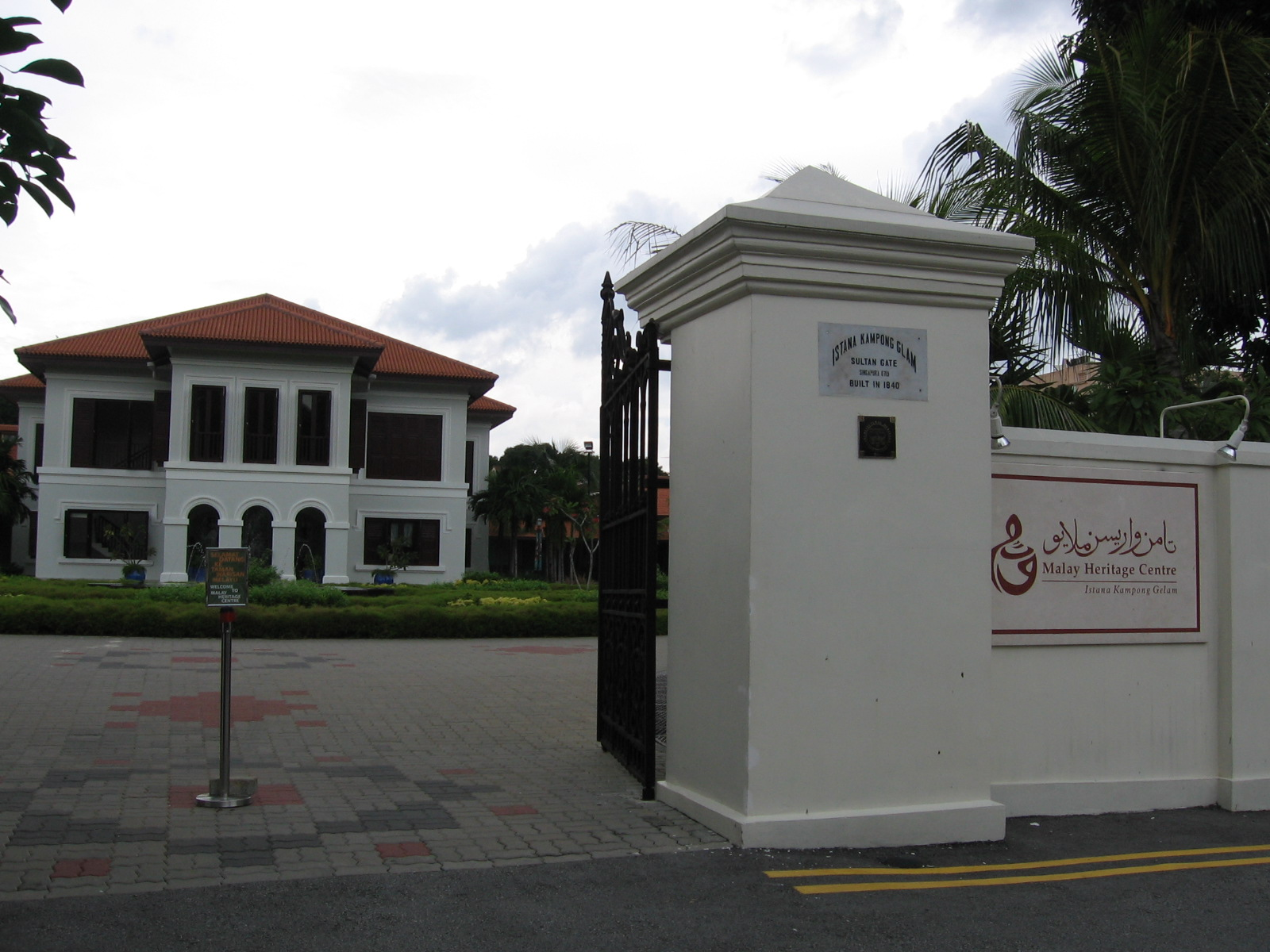
Istana Kampong Glam

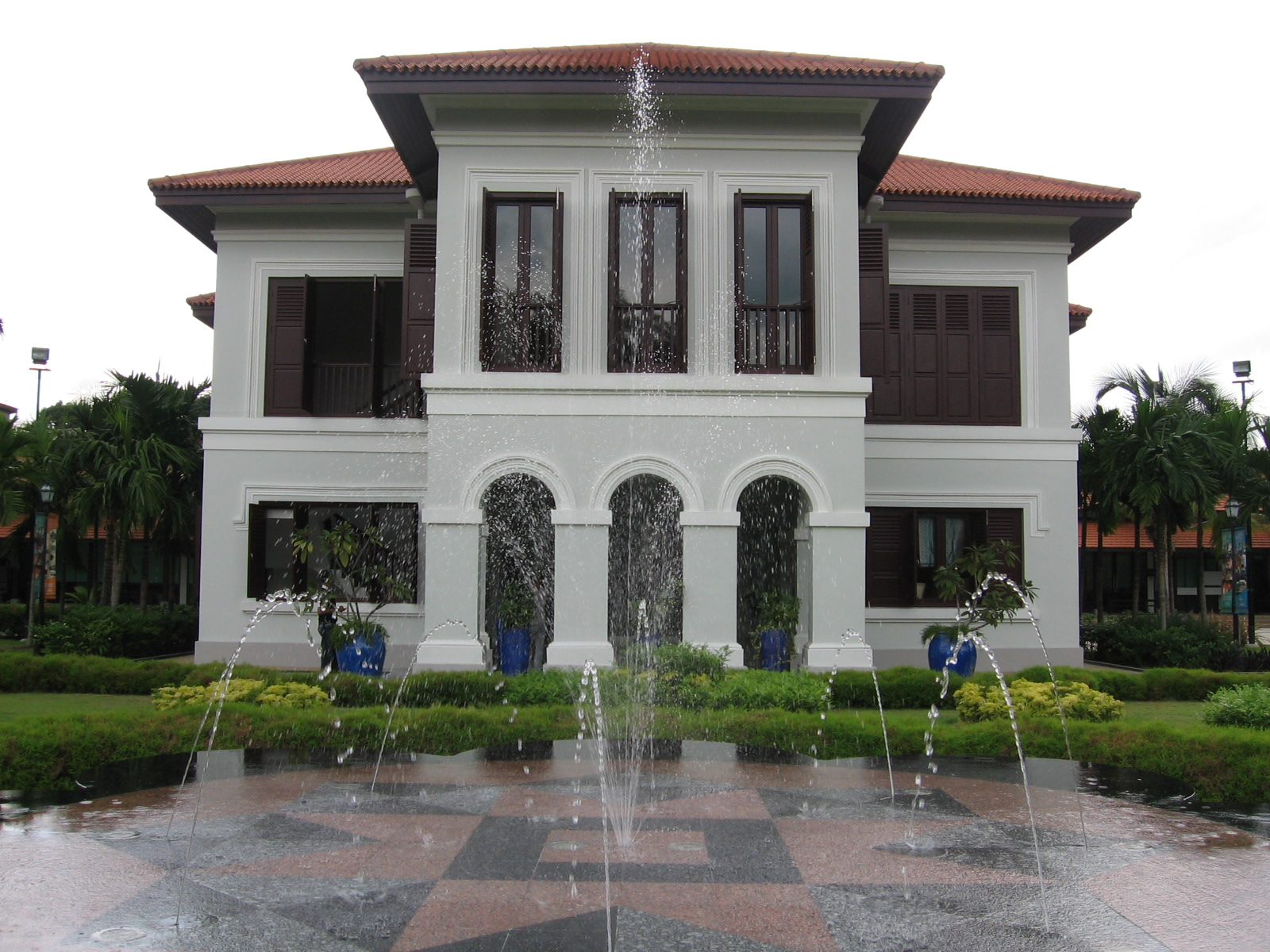
Istana Kampong Glam

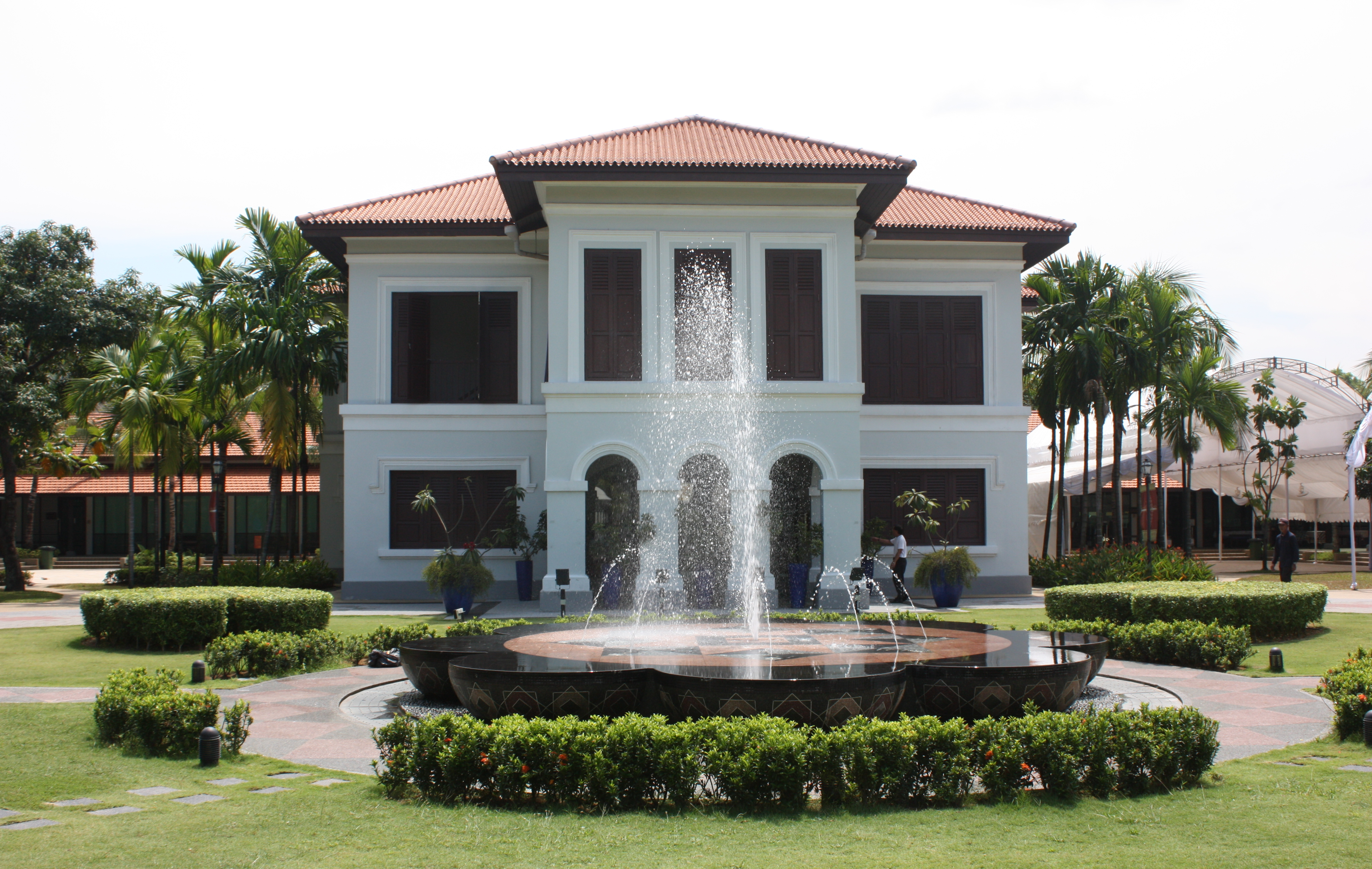
Istana Kampong Glam with fountain at the Malay Heritage Centre

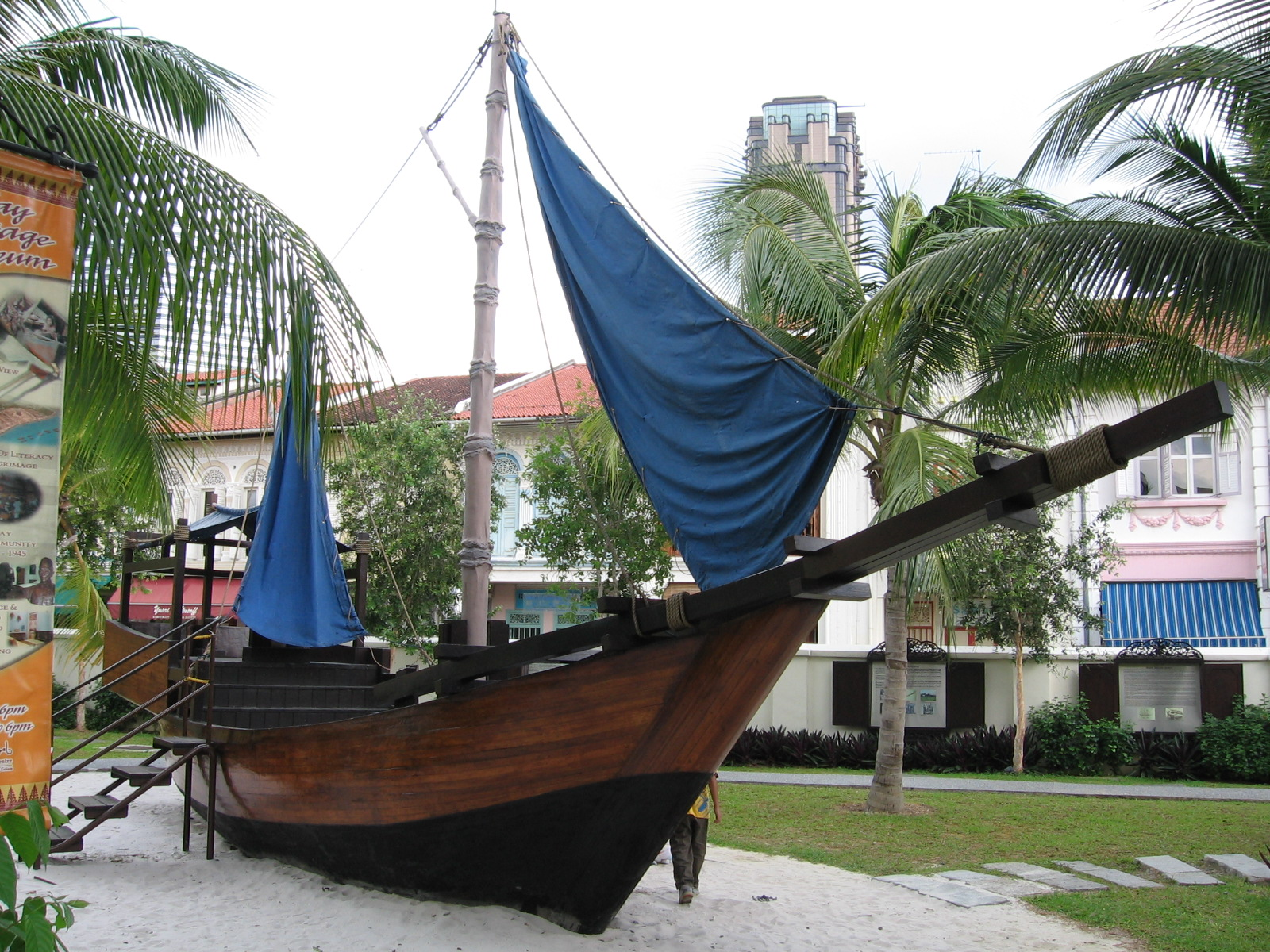
Perahu Bugis (Pinisi)

== See also ==
- Demographics of Singapore
- Malay Village – a former Malay museum in Singapore
