= Sultan Mosque =

Historic mosque in Kampong Glam, Singapore

Sultan Mosque Masjid Sultan (مسجد سلطان)

- Location in Singapore

Religion
- Affiliation: Sunni Islam

Location
- Location: 3 Muscat Street, Singapore 198833
- Country: Singapore
- Coordinates: 1.3022°N 103.8590°E

Architecture
- Architect: Denis Santry
- Type: Congregational mosque
- Style: Indo-Saracenic architecture
- Founder: Hussein Shah of Johor
- Established: 1819
- Completed: 1826; 1932 (Reconstruction)
- Construction cost: $250,000 (1932 reconstruction)

Specifications
- Dome: 2
- Minaret: 2
- Designated as NHL

National monument of Singapore
- Designated: 8 March 1975; 51 years ago
- Reference no.: 14

The Sultan Mosque (Jawi: مسجد سلطان) is a historic congregational mosque located in the Kampong Glam district of Rochor, Singapore. First built in 1826 and later rebuilt into its current form in 1932, the Sultan Mosque is one of the national monuments of Singapore and is considered to be the most well-known mosque in the country.

== History ==
In 1819, Hussein Shah of Johor ordered the construction of the Sultan Mosque next to the Istana Kampong Glam, which was completed in 1826 with funding from both locals as well as Stamford Raffles, the latter who had contributed a sum of $3,000. In 1879, Tengku Alam Shah appointed a group of five men to serve as the trustees of the mosque, which were later replaced by a committee of twelve members in 1914. A domed mausoleum was also built behind the mosque after 1891, which served as the burial place for Tengku Alam Shah and members of the House of Bendahara.

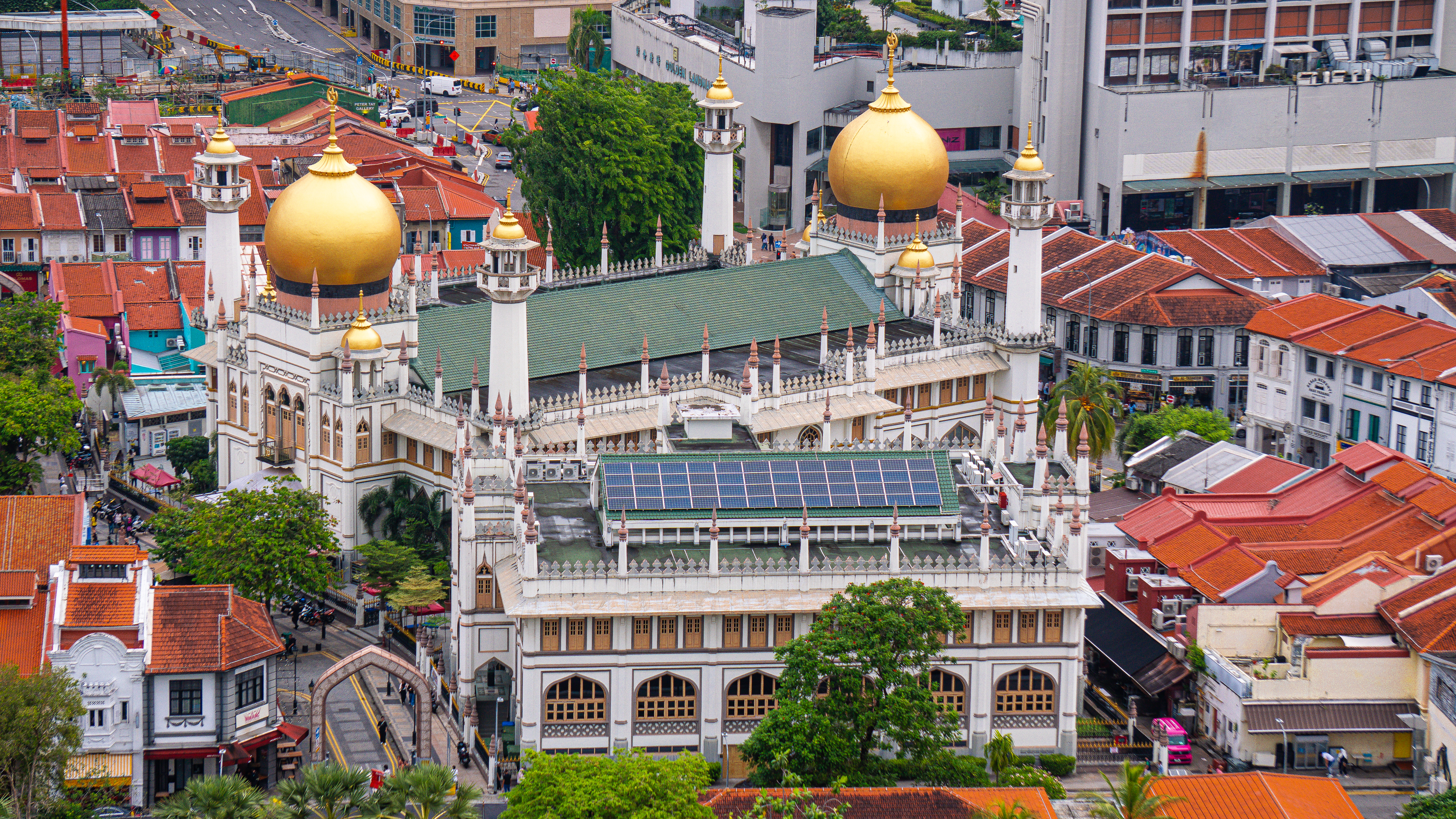
An aerial view of the Sultan Mosque, taken in 2025.

Over time, the Sultan Mosque entered a stage of dilapidation and hence plans for a new, larger mosque were confirmed in 1924 by the mosque's committee. Irish architect Denis Santry from the Swan & Maclaren Group was hired to design the new mosque. Between 1925 to 1931, parts of the existing Sultan Mosque were demolished and rebuilt from the ground up in stages, due to a combination of insufficient funding as well as not to disrupt the daily prayers held in the building. Construction on the Sultan Mosque was eventually completed in 1932, at the total cost of $250,000.

During the Second World War, the Sultan Mosque was damaged by a Japanese airstrike. Then in 1950, the mosque was the centre of the Maria Hertogh Riots when a group of rioters burned police vans that were in the vicinity of the mosque, while Muslim community leaders tried to stop the violence by blaring warnings to the rioters from the minarets. Several rioters also hid themselves in the mosque until Muslim officers were able to enter and apprehend them with the approval of the chief qāḍī from the local Islamic council. After the formation of the Majlis Ugama Islam Singapura (MUIS), management of the Sultan Mosque officially fell under the purview of the MUIS by 1968. Repairs to the mosque were also undertaken in the same year, which cost $145,000 and were funded by both the local community and a $37,000 donation from Faisal of Saudi Arabia.

The Sultan Mosque was gazetted as a national monument of Singapore on 8 March 1975, in recognition of its cultural and historical significance. An annexe building was also constructed within the compound of the mosque in 1993 and opened by the then-Prime Minister of Singapore, Goh Chok Tong. Years later, in 2014, the MUIS organized an extensive restoration project for the mosque, which took approximately two years to complete, with a plaque unveiled on 16 January 2016 by Lee Hsien Loong to mark the completion of the restoration.

== Architecture ==
The Sultan Mosque is built with a classical architectural style influenced by Indo-Saracenic architecture. The main building of the mosque, which includes its main prayer hall and memorial, face the direction of Mecca and are not aligned with Muscat Street and North Bridge Road. The compound of the mosque is enclosed by railings and concrete walls, with rear and front entrances.

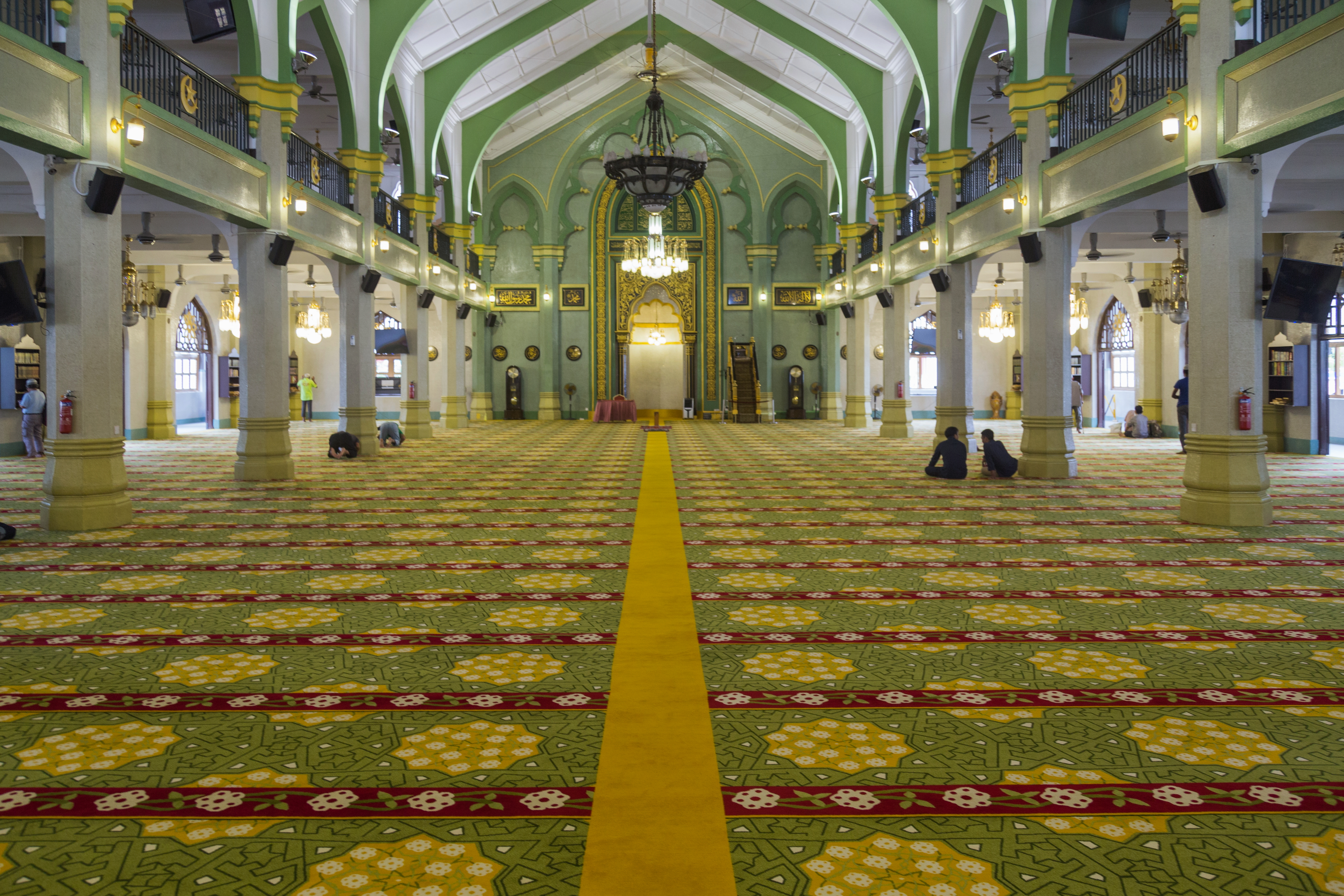
Inside the main prayer hall of the Sultan Mosque.

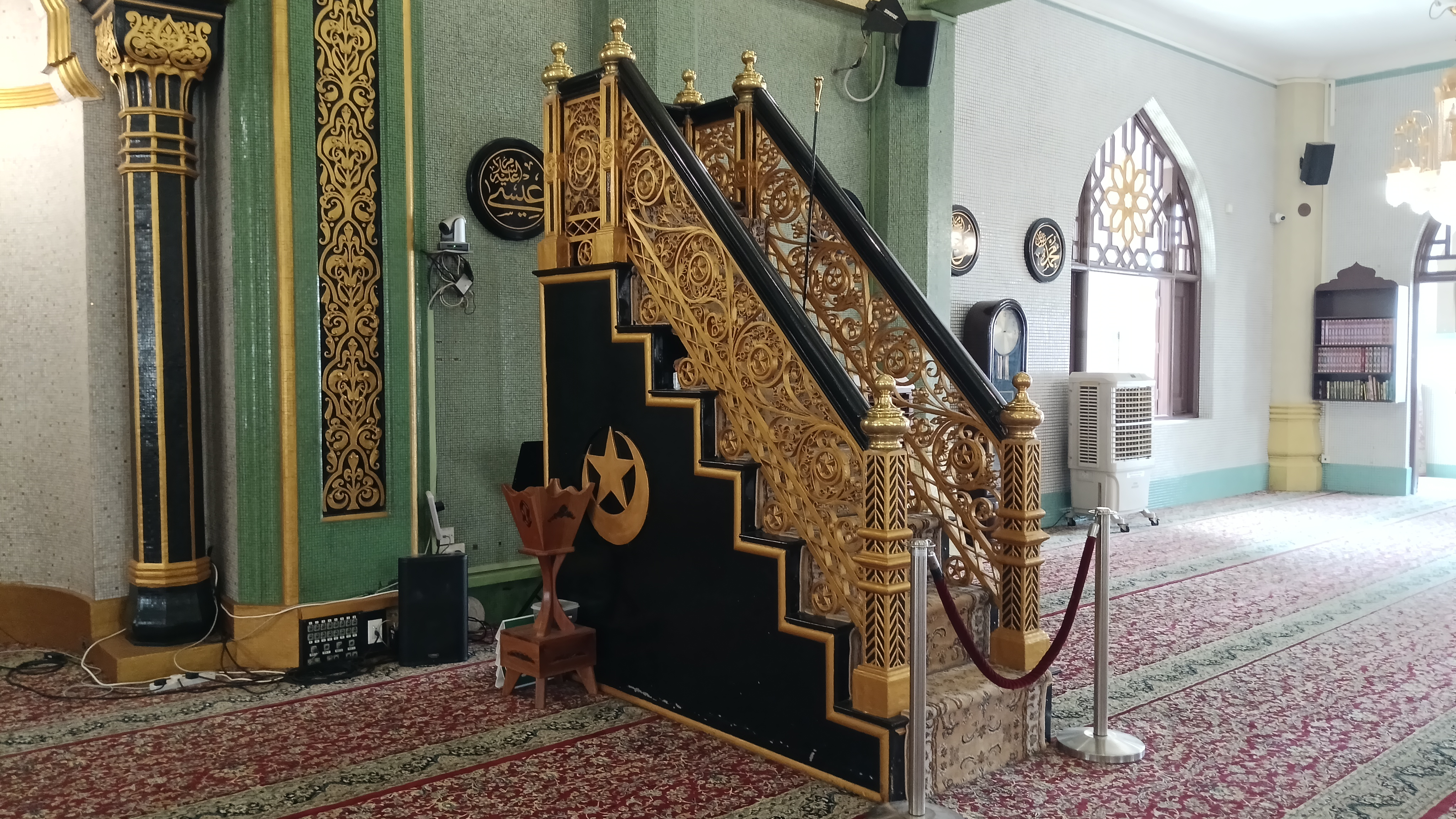
The minbar (pulpit) of the mosque.

The mosque has two identical gold-coloured onion domes that top each corner of the main building. Each onion dome is topped by a crescent-and-star emblem, while the base of the domes are both adorned with the sawn-off ends of glass bottles that were collected from the poor during the reconstruction process of the mosque. The dome facing North Bridge Road tops a private memorial that contains a cenotaph dedicated to Tengku Alam Shah and his family, who were formerly buried in a mausoleum behind the mosque. This room, known as a Makam ("tomb"), is not open to the public, with accessibility restricted to relatives of the Sultan of Johor.

Each corner of the mosque is flanked by minaret-like balconies that are topped by a golden dome. Two eight-storey minarets are also situated on either side of the eastern facade facing Muscat Street. These minarets are the only minarets in the country that are still allowed to broadcast the adhan, the Islamic call to prayer.

== Significance ==
The Sultan Mosque is a prominent tourist attraction in the Kampong Glam area, with its grounds open to visitors of different faiths. It is mainly visited by tourists that come from America, Europe and Japan. The building is also an important heritage site and symbol of the Malay-Muslim community in Singapore. Aside from functioning as the main congregational mosque in the heart of Kampong Glam, the Sultan Mosque also functions as a hub for social and charitable activities such as live Qur'anic recitations, donation drives, and seminars. During Islamic events such as the month of Ramadan, bazaars are held in the areas around the mosque.

The Sultan Mosque was once regarded as the oldest surviving mosque in the country. This was later disproven by local heritage researchers who concluded that Masjid Omar Kampong Melaka was instead the oldest due to being built in 1820, while the Sultan Mosque was first established in 1819 but completed in 1826. However, it is still considered to be the most iconic and notable mosque in Singapore.

== See also ==
- Islam in Singapore
- List of mosques in Singapore
