= Victoria Street, Singapore =

Road in Singapore

Coordinates: 1°17′55″N 103°51′15″E

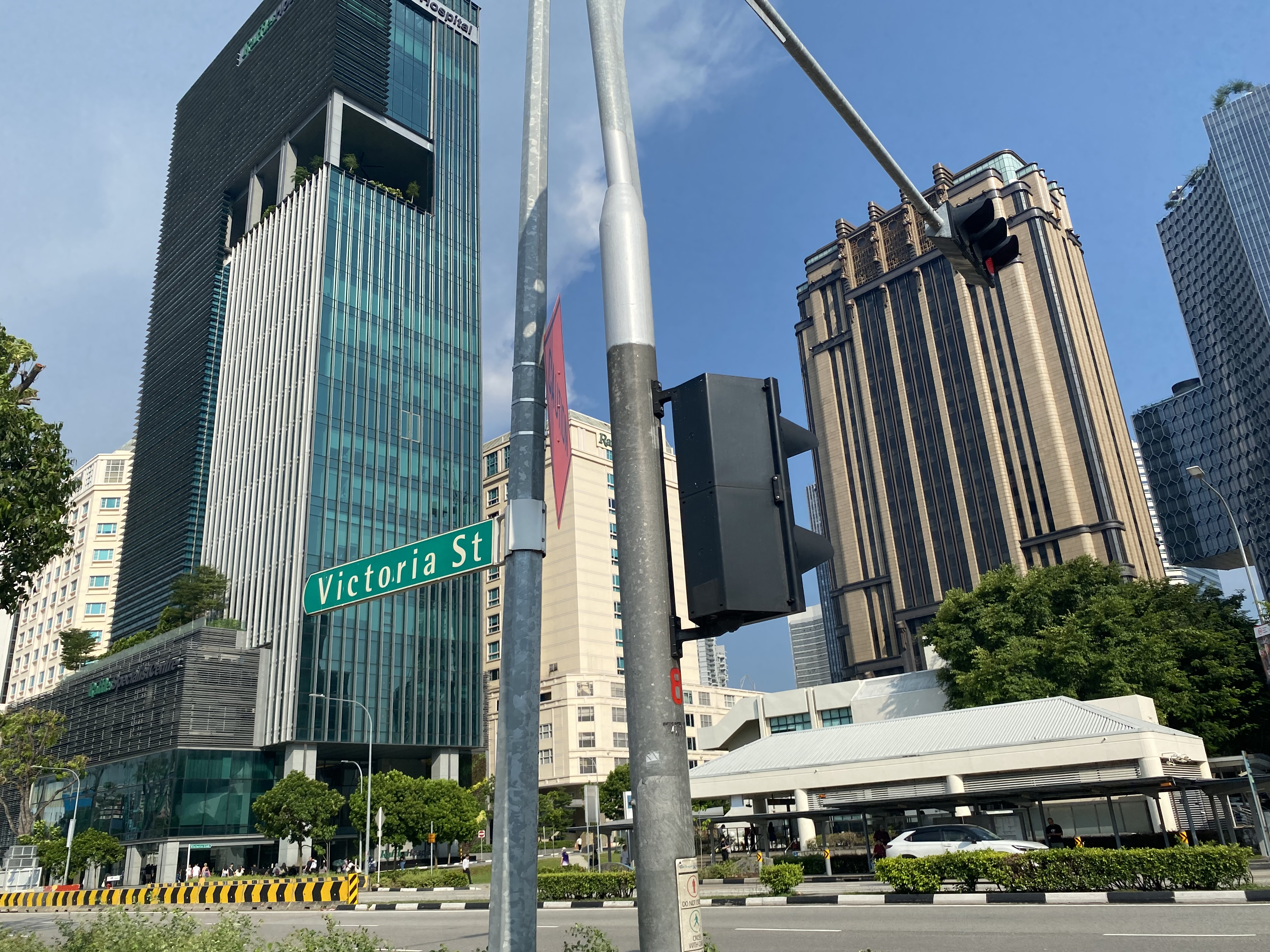
Victoria Street close to Bugis MRT station

Victoria Street (Note: Chinese: 维多利亚街. There is no official translation (not transliteration) in Malay or Tamil, and the English name is retained in its original form in both languages.) is a major two-way road in Singapore. It links Kallang Road in the northeast with Hill Street in the southwest. En route, Victoria Street passes through the planning areas of Kallang, Rochor, Downtown Core and Museum. The road is lined with a mix of heritage landmarks, religious institutions, retail centres and educational facilities. Historically, it has served as a key axis connecting older civic spaces with newer commercial zones.

== History ==
Victoria Street was formally named in 1848 to commemorate the tenth anniversary of Queen Victoria's reign, as part of the British colonial administration's practice of honouring members of the British royal family through urban toponymy. The street had earlier appeared in colonial plans under different names. In the 1823 Jackson Plan, it was marked as Rochor Street, reflecting its connection to the developing Rochor area. Later, George Drumgoole Coleman referred to it as Marbro Street, an abbreviated term derived from "Marlborough" in honour of the Duke of Marlborough. Although it was not part of the original Jackson Plan in its finalised form, the street became an important corridor in Singapore's expanding townscape during the mid-19th century, linking the civic district with the growing residential and commercial quarters of Bugis, Kampong Glam and Rochor.

=== Naming ===
Victoria Street was historically referred to as Ji Beh Lor, meaning "Second Horse Carriageway", by the local Chinese community. Like several other roads in the area, it was part of a sequence of main thoroughfares whose English names proved difficult for Chinese speakers to pronounce, leading to the adoption of numerical nicknames based on Hokkien terms for horse-drawn carriage routes. This sequence began with North Bridge Road as "Toa Beh Lor" (First Horse Carriageway), followed by Queen Street as "Sa Beh Lor" (Third Horse Carriageway), (Note: Queen Street was also colloquially known as "Sek A Ni Koi", a Hokkien rendition of the Malay term for Eurasians, Serani reflecting the presence of a significant Eurasian community in the area.) Waterloo Street as "Si Beh Lor" (Fourth Horse Carriageway), Bencoolen Street as "Gor Beh Lor" (Fifth Horse Carriageway), Prinsep Street as "Lak Beh Lor" (Sixth Horse Carriageway) and Selegie Road as "Chit Beh Lor" (Seventh Horse Carriageway).

== Landmarks ==
Victoria Street passes through the historic districts of Kampong Glam, Bugis and Bras Basah. Notable landmarks along the road include (from north to south):

- Hotel Boss
- Masjid Malabar
- Victoria Street Wholesale Centre near Ophir Road and Arab Street
- Bugis Street
- Bugis Junction
- National Library building
- Nanyang Academy of Fine Arts, Middle Road campus
- Saint Joseph's Church, a national monument
- Bras Basah Complex
- Singapore Management University, Administration building and Lee Kong Chian School of Business
- Cathedral of the Good Shepherd, a national monument
- Former CHIJ which has been turned into a popular entertainment venue called CHIJMES, now a national monument
- Bugis+, formerly known as Iluma
