= Bugis MRT station =

Mass Rapid Transit station in Singapore

Bugis EW12 DT14 武吉士 பூகிஸ்
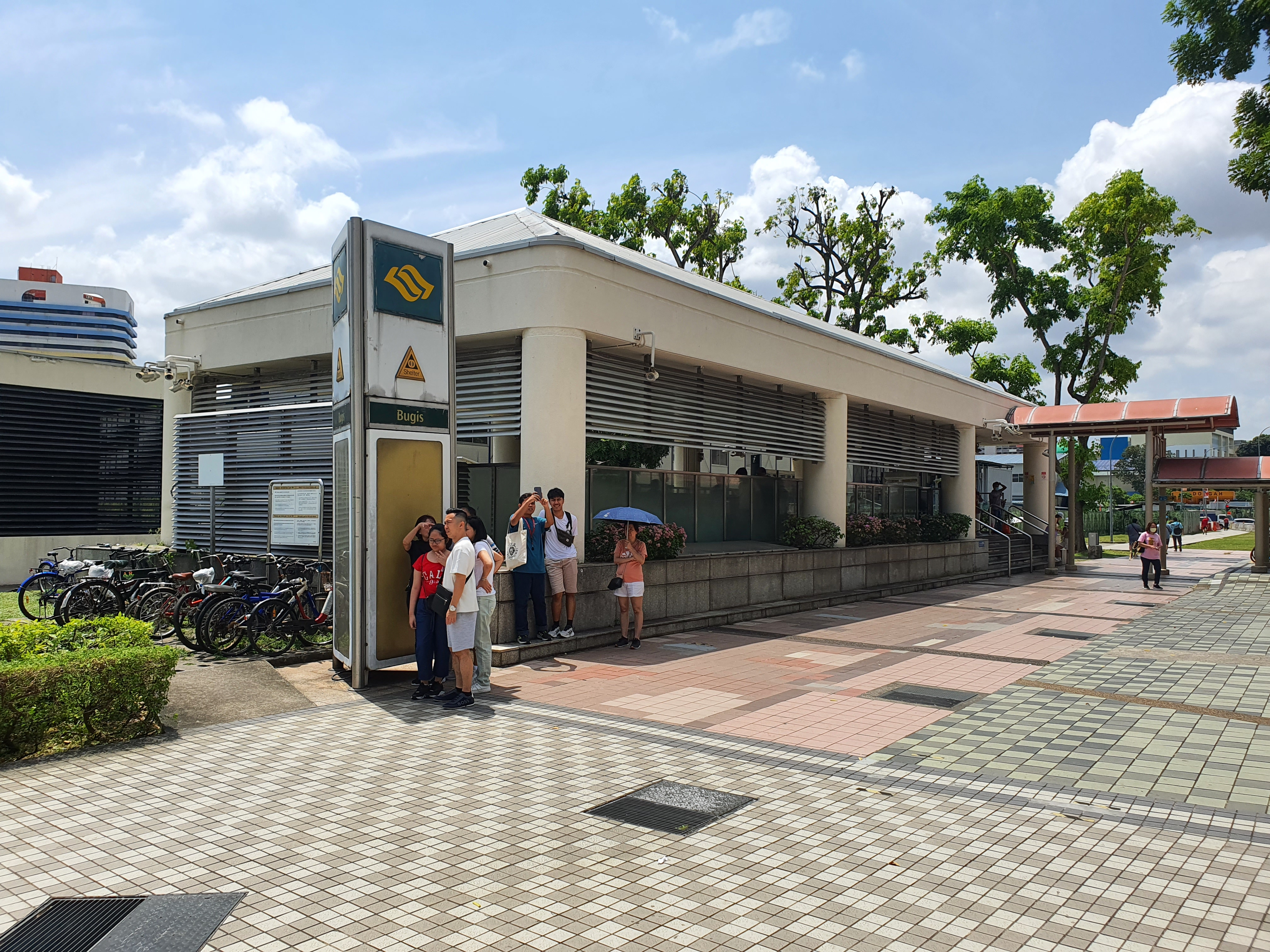
- Exit A of Bugis MRT station

General information
- Location: 220 Victoria Street, Singapore 188022 (EWL); 191 Rochor Road, Singapore 188476 (DTL)
- Coordinates: 01°18′01″N 103°51′22″E
- System: Mass Rapid Transit (MRT) interchange
- Owner: Land Transport Authority
- Operator: SMRT Trains (East–West Line); SBS Transit (Downtown Line)
- Line: East–West Line Downtown Line
- Platforms: 4 (2 island platforms)
- Tracks: 4
- Connections: Queen Street Bus Terminal, Taxi

Construction
- Structure type: Underground
- Platform levels: 2
- Parking: Yes (Bugis Junction, Bugis+)
- Cycle facilities: Yes
- Accessible: Yes

Other information
- Station code: BGS

History
- Opened: 4 November 1989; 37 years ago (East–West Line); 22 December 2013; 12 years ago (Downtown Line)
- Former names: Rochore, Victoria

Passengers
- June 2024: 53,016 per day

Services
Preceding station	Mass Rapid Transit	Following station
Lavender towards Pasir Ris	East–West Line	City Hall towards Tuas Link
Rochor towards Bukit Panjang	Downtown Line	Promenade towards Expo
Track layout
Location
- Location within Singapore Rail central area

Bugis MRT station is an underground Mass Rapid Transit (MRT) interchange station on the East–West (EWL) and Downtown (DTL) lines, in Bugis, Singapore. The station is located underneath the junction of Rochor Road and Victoria Street. Various developments surrounding the station include Bugis Junction, Raffles Hospital and the National Library. The station is also close to Kampung Glam.

Initially announced as Rochore, the station was renamed Victoria and subsequently Bugis. The station was part of the early plans for the original MRT network in 1982 and opened in November 1989 as part of the MRT's eastern line extension. In 2007, it was announced that Bugis station would interchange with the planned DTL. The DTL platforms opened on 22 December 2013 as part of DTL Stage 1. Bugis EWL station is a designated Civil Defence shelter, while the DTL station is adorned with a diamond motif reflective of Bugis culture. As part of the Art-in-Transit programme, the station features Ephemeral by Patrick Chia.

== History ==
=== East–West Line ===
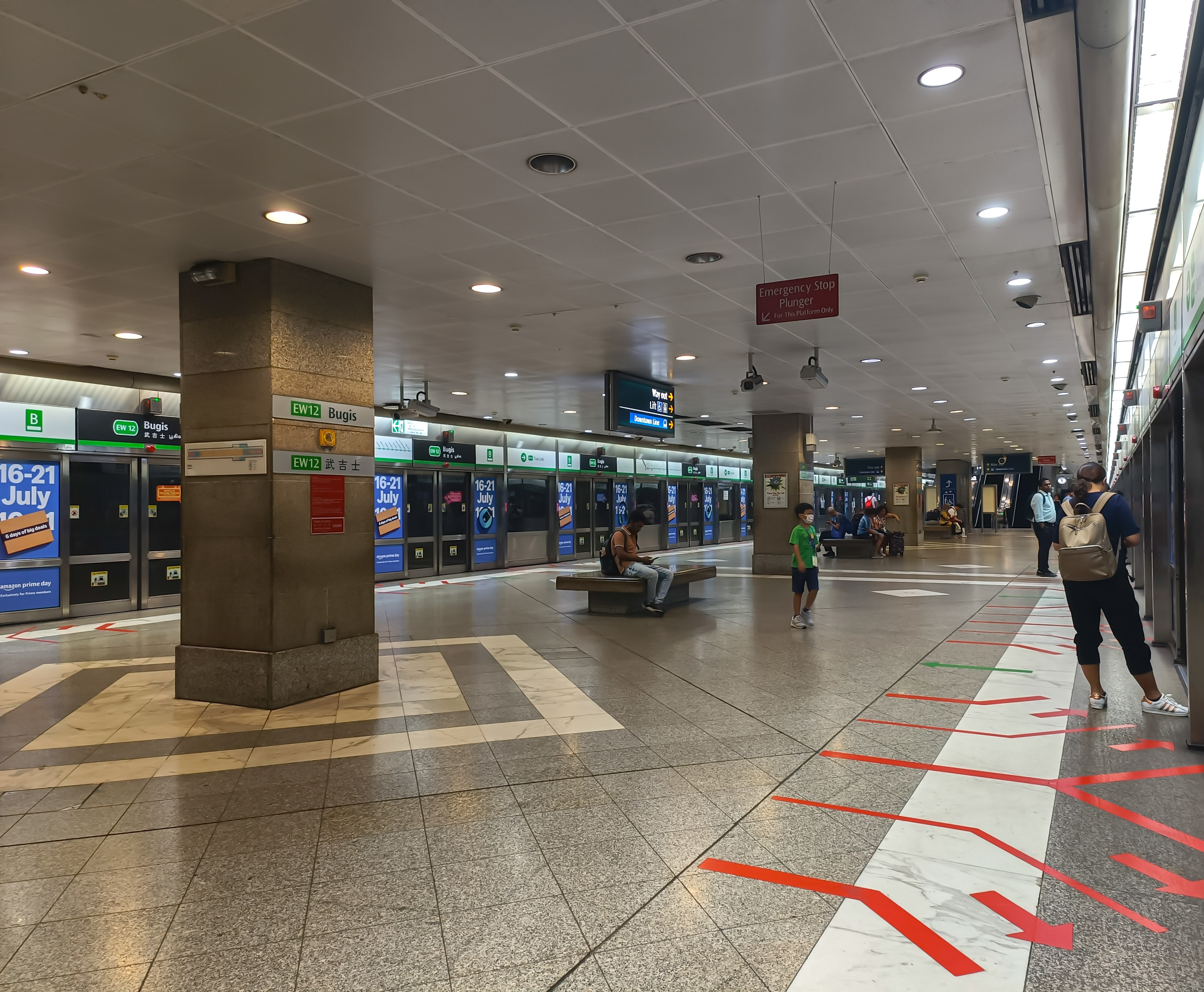
EWL platforms

What was then known as Rochore station was included in the early plans of the MRT network published in May 1982. The station was officially confirmed as Victoria station when the Phase II stations were announced in October 1983. The contract for the construction of Victoria station and the adjacent Lavender station was awarded to a joint venture between Nishimatsu and Lum Chang Pte Ltd for S$227 million (US$315.2 million in 2022) in October 1985. The contract included the construction of tunnels between Bras Basah Road and the Kallang River.

The Barisan Sosialis headquarters along Victoria Street was acquired for the MRT project. To facilitate construction works for the station, the Soon Theng Khong temple at Malabar Street was relocated to Albert Street in March 1986, while shophouses close to the temple were demolished. The MRTC and contractors also monitored other old buildings close to the station site for any movement during construction.

It was initially planned to close off Victoria Street to allow cut-and-cover construction of tunnels between Victoria and Lavender due to the soft marine clay. However, the contractors instead proposed strengthening the soil to allow the boring of tunnels, which was accepted by the MRT Corporation (MRTC). A section of Victoria Street between Rochor Road and Cheng Yan Road was realigned for six months from June to December 1986 to allow the implementation of diaphragm walls at the station site. In response to a suggestion by the Singapore Tourist Promotion Board, the station was renamed Bugis in November 1986 after Bugis Street, a tourist spot near the station. Bugis station opened on 18 November 1989 as part of the MRT system's eastern line from this station to Tanah Merah.

=== Downtown Line ===
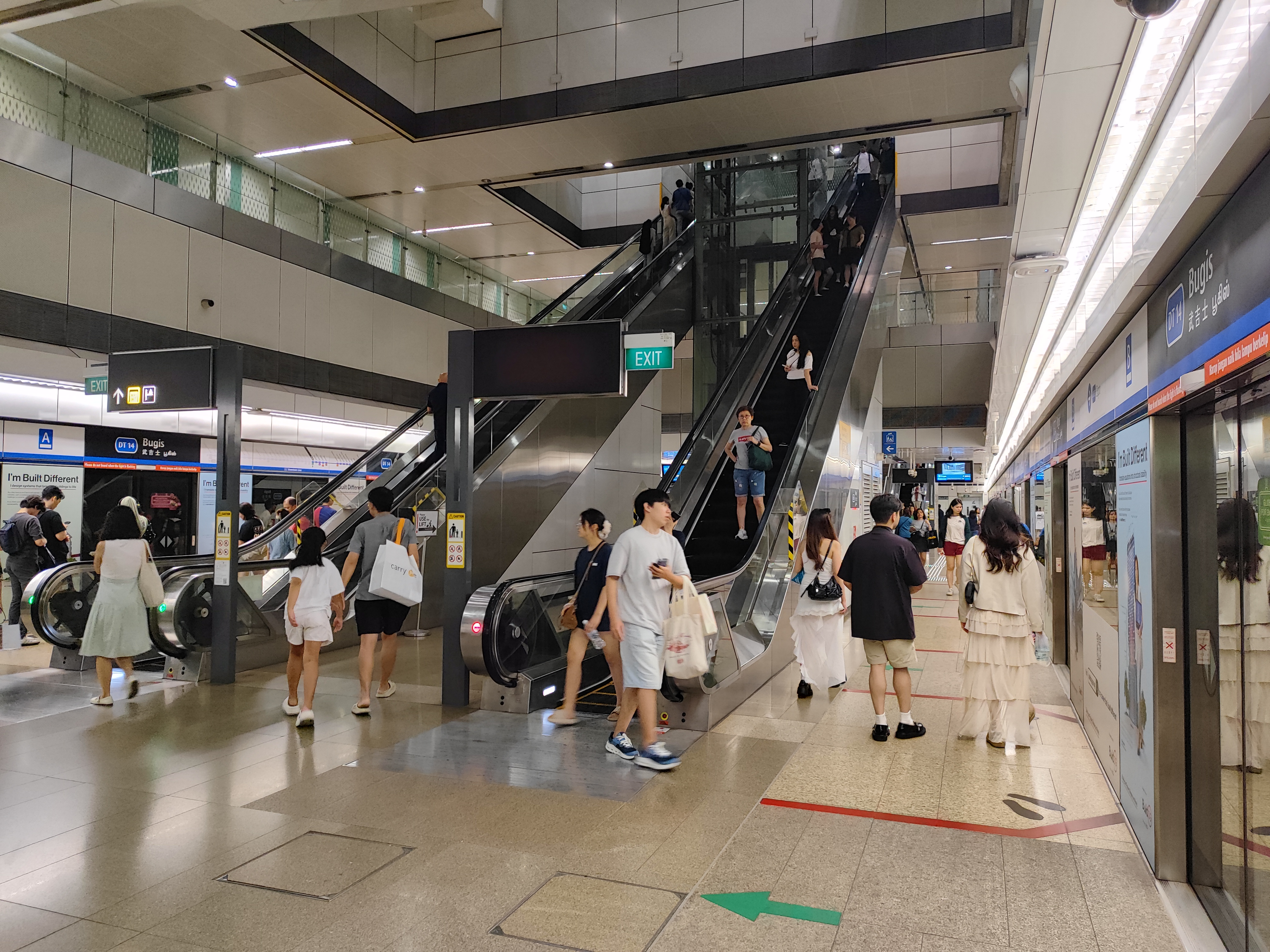
DTL platforms

In April 2007, the Land Transport Authority (LTA) announced that Bugis station would be part of the first stage of the Downtown Line (DTL). The contract for the construction of the DTL station and its associated tunnels was awarded to a joint venture between Soletanche Bachy and Koh Brothers for S$582 million (US$411.3 million) in November 2008. Construction of the station was expected to begin in the first quarter of 2009, with a set completion date of 2013, and involved the diversion of Rochor Road.

The New 7th Storey Hotel was acquired by the government, as part of the hotel site was needed to construct the station's facilities such as lifts and escalators. While the hotel staff and patrons were dismayed by the news, with some petitioning to the LTA to retain the hotel, the LTA explained that construction works would affect the hotel's structure and that it could risk collapse due to the soft marine clay, which consistency had been compared with toothpaste. In addition, the DHL Balloon was taken down in October 2008 as the site was needed for the station's construction.

The soft marine clay at the station site was strengthened using cross walls, alongside cement and fibreglass. Mining was used to construct tunnels at Beach Road, Queen Street, and under the existing EWL station. Clearance issues in certain portions of the tunnel necessitated the manual installation of steel frames during excavation. For the tunnels at Beach Road and Queen Street, the soil around the tunnels was stabilised using jet grouting, a retaining structure comprising horizontal pipe piles was installed using compressed air-operated hammers, and steel frames were used to support the piles during the tunnels' construction. This allowed excavation under the existing EWL station.

Most of the station was built using the cut-and-cover method, with a bottom-up method used for the section between North Bridge Road and Beach Road. The top-down method was used for the part between North Bridge Road and Queen Street, as the road above could not be easily diverted, with excavation commencing only after the walls and roof of the station were built. To mitigate noise pollution, an acoustic screen was installed beside a residential area, and a special enclosure was constructed around the excavation site. On 18 July 2012, the collapse of scaffolding holding up the roof of a linkway at the station site resulted in the death of two workers and eight others injured.

Bugis station held an open house on 7 December 2013. Bugis DTL station commenced operations on 22 December 2013 along with the DTL Stage 1 stations.

== Station details ==
Bugis station is an interchange station on the EWL and DTL. On the EWL, the station is between the Lavender and City Hall stations, while the station is between the Rochor and Promenade stations on the DTL. The official station code is EW12/DT14. When it opened, it had the station code of E1 before being changed to the current alphanumeric style in August 2001 as a part of a system-wide campaign to cater to the expanding MRT System. Located beneath the junction of Victoria Street and Rochor Road, the station is close to Fu Lu Shou Complex, Raffles Hospital, the National Library, Bugis+ and Bugis Junction. The station also serves the ethnic enclave of Kampung Glam and its landmarks such as Sultan Mosque, Arab Street and Haji Lane. Bugis station is within walking distance of the Jalan Besar station on the DTL and Bras Basah station on the Circle Line.

Bugis is one of the first nine underground MRT stations designated as a Civil Defence (CD) shelter. Built to function as an air-raid shelter during emergencies, the EWL station was fitted with steel blast doors that could seal off the station concourse and platforms. The DTL station has a depth of 26 m (85 ft) and features a diamond motif reflective of Bugis culture.

The station is wheelchair-accessible. A tactile system, consisting of tiles with rounded or elongated raised studs, guides visually impaired commuters through the station, with dedicated routes that connect the station entrances to the platforms or between the lines. Wider fare gates allow easier access for wheelchair users into the station.

=== Public art ===
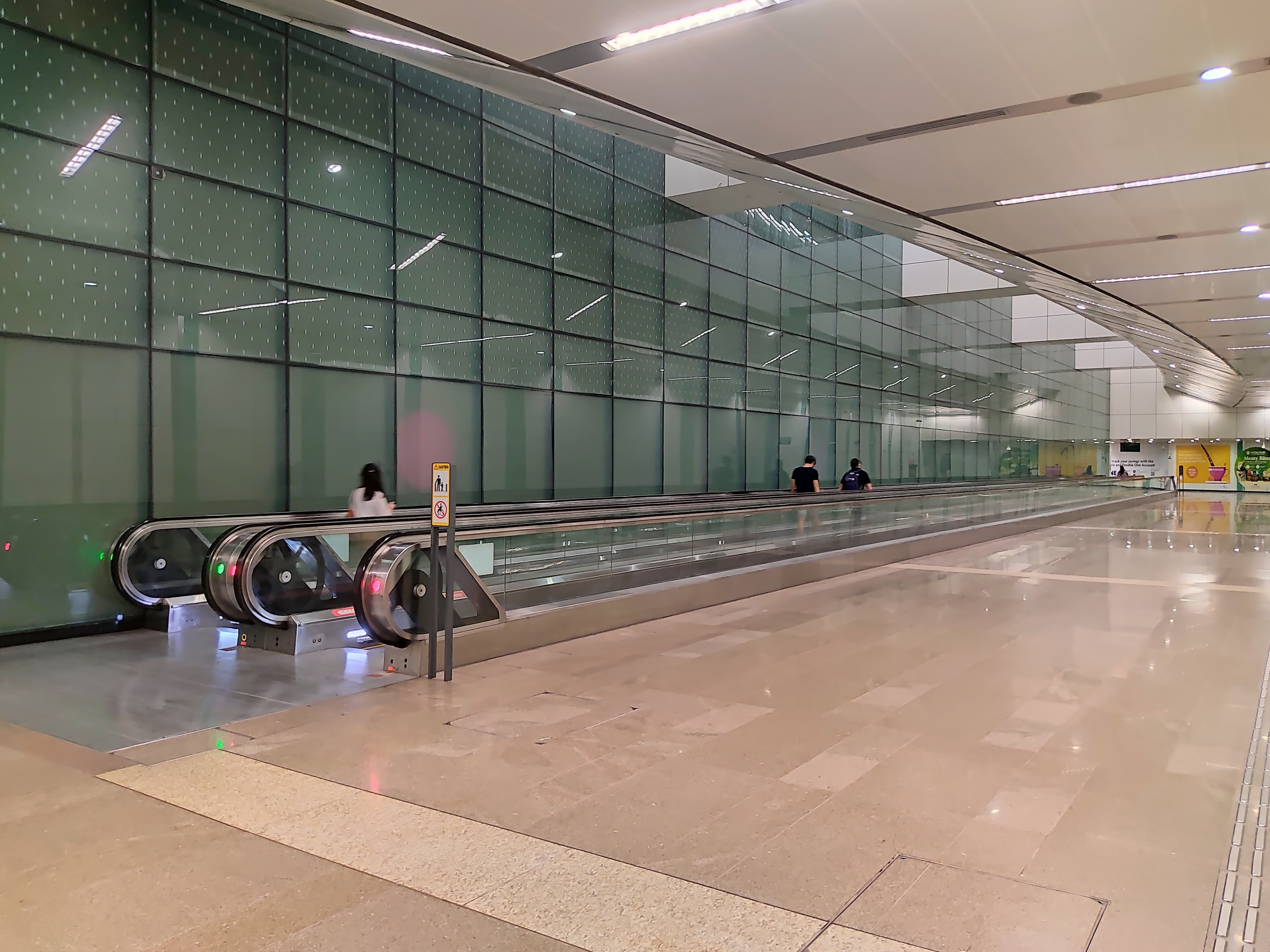
The artwork along the linkway of the station

Ephemeral by Patrick Chia is featured at this station as part of the Art-in-Transit programme, a showcase of public artworks on the MRT network. Displayed along the travellator on the linkway between the DTL and EWL platforms, the interactive work consists of coloured discs hidden behind glass panels and could only be viewed from specific angles before fading away. The artist hoped to engage commuters and the station architecture through this work, instead of producing a work that only reflects the area's history and landmarks. Ephemeral was also intended to create "a concept that exploits the constraints and opportunities afforded by the architecture space" and that it was "not meant to be obvious but to engage each commuter at his or her own moment".

While simple in concept, crafting the work was difficult. Chia crafted many prototypes of the discs and experimented with the sizes, lighting and placement to achieve the "powdery effect" on frosted glass. Engineers were also consulted to take into account the travellator's speed to determine the suitable spacings of the discs. Other challenges included the greenish tint of the panels that subdued the colour of the discs and the distinctive black outline that disrupted Chia's intention of a "seamless viewing experience". Nevertheless, Chia tweaked the work accordingly to accomplish the desired effect as closely as possible.
