= DHL Balloon =

Tethered helium balloon in Singapore in operation between 2006 and 2008

Coordinates: 1°17′54.5″N 103°51′25.8″E

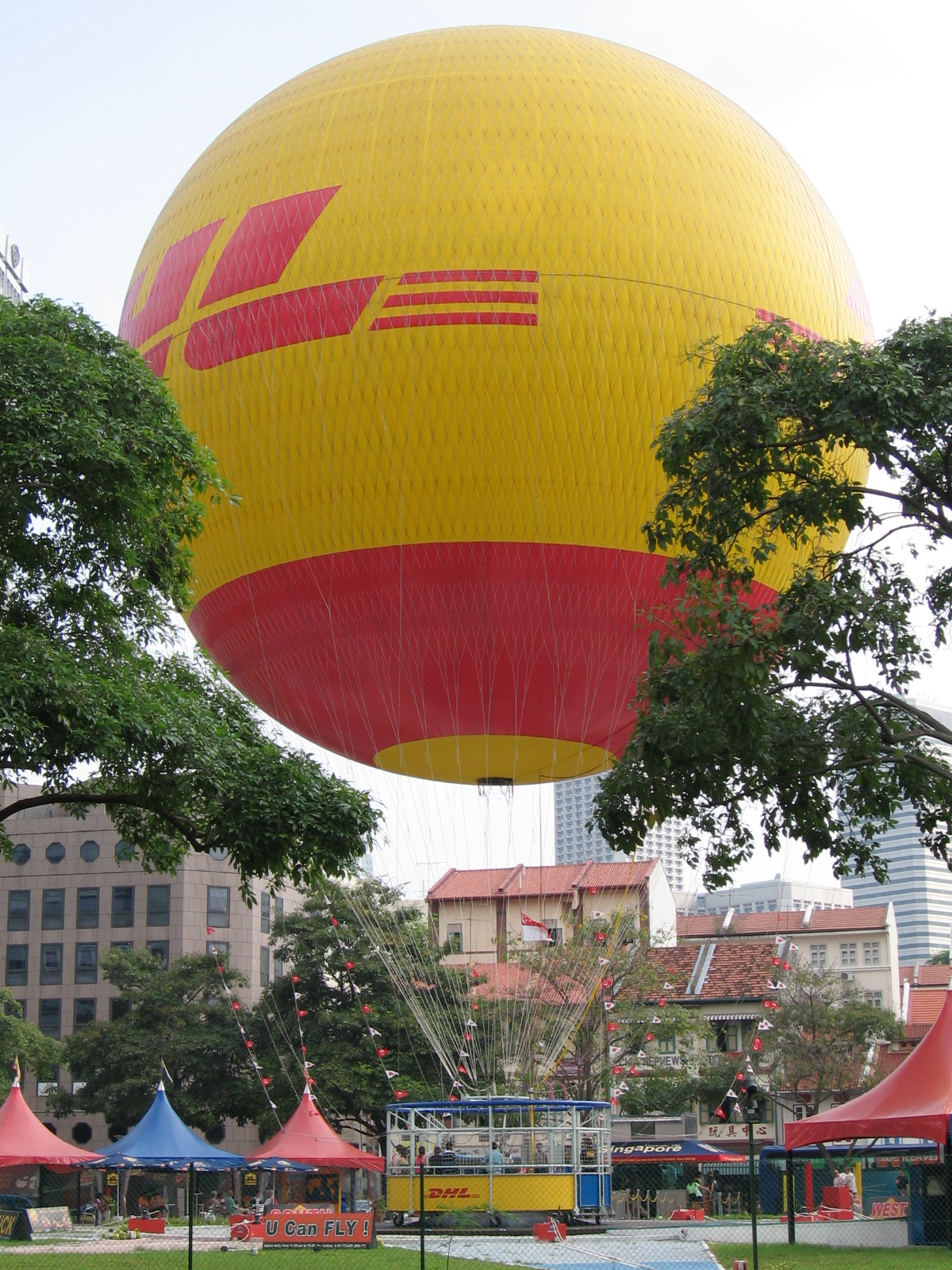
The DHL Balloon was the world's second largest tethered helium balloon

The DHL Balloon, in Singapore, was the world's second largest tethered helium balloon. It was inflated in 2006, and closed and dismantled in October 2008.

== History ==
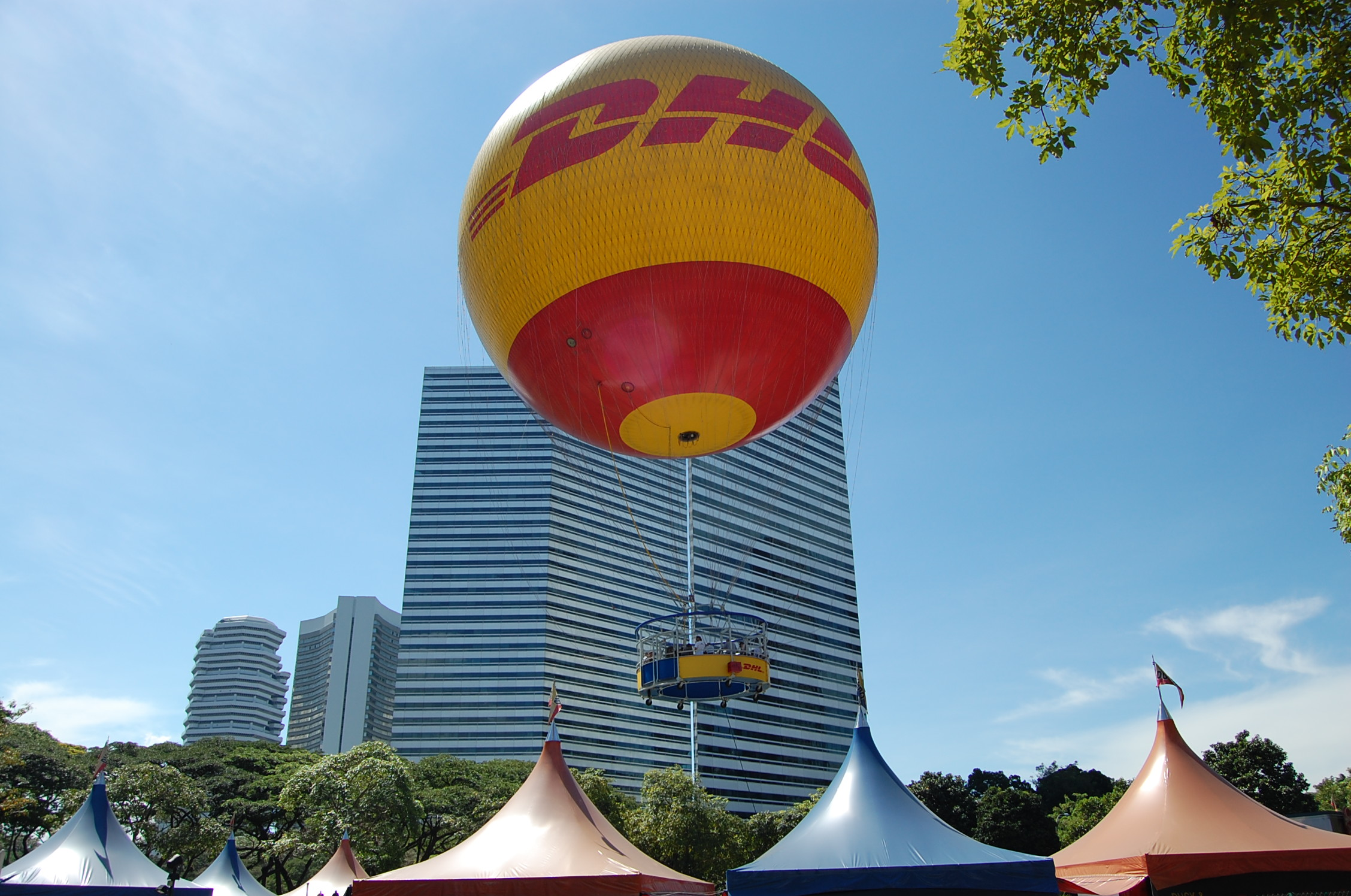

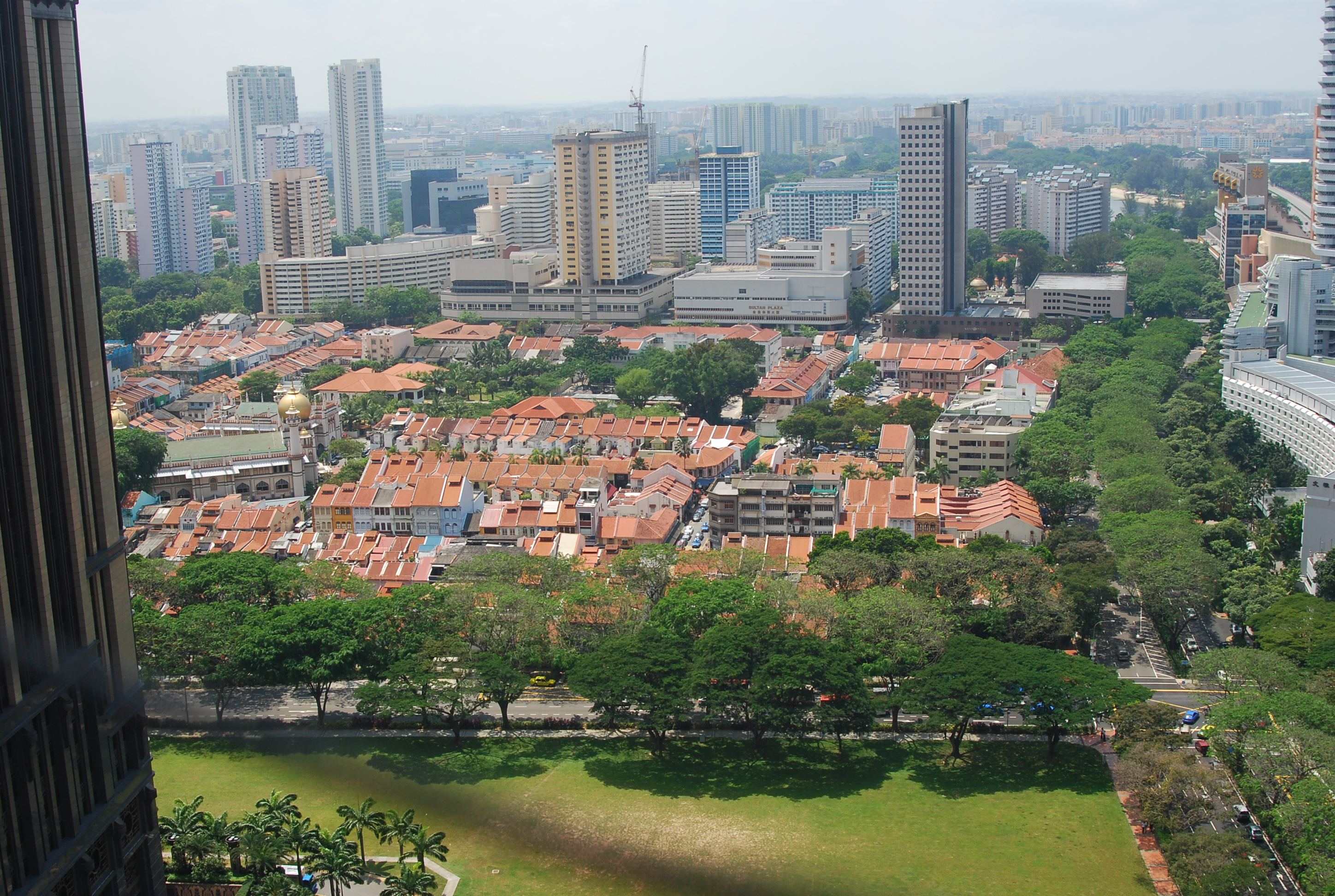
View from the balloon of the heritage quarter and office towers

The DHL Balloon was first located on Tan Quee Lan Street in the Downtown Core of Singapore, near the New 7th Storey Hotel and Bugis MRT station. Launched at a cost of S$2.5 million, the DHL Balloon was a joint venture by Aerophile Balloon Singapore Pte Ltd and Vertical Adventure Pte Ltd, and took one year to plan. The project was sponsored by global courier, freight and logistics company DHL Express which received exclusive advertising space on the balloon.

The business partners involved in the project worked with the Urban Redevelopment Authority (URA), Singapore Land Authority and Singapore Tourism Board to allow public advertising on the balloon, and arranged to lease the site at a cost of more than S$1 million over two years. Prior to this project, large advertisements in public areas were not allowed in Singapore. S$800,000 was spent priming the ground for the balloon and another S$60,000 to purchase the helium.

On 19 April 2006, 40 crew members took 12 hours to inflate the French-made balloon, which took its first passengers in May 2006. The DHL Balloon was operated by Singapore Ducktours, a company which also offers city tours on its amphibious vehicles. By September 2007, more than 150,000 people had ridden on the balloon, 70% of whom were tourists. Up to 1,000 people rode the balloon each weekend and its usage was the highest among all of Aerophile's balloons.

The DHL Balloon's lease on its site on Tan Quee Lan Street expired in August 2008 and URA terminated the lease as the site was to be used for the new Downtown line's Bugis MRT station. Singapore Ducktours considered three alternative sites: Beach Road near Park View Hotel, Clarke Quay near Novotel Clarke Quay Hotel, and Gardens by the Bay at Marina Bay but was told by the authorities that these sites were unavailable. Other plans included relocating the balloon to Kuala Lumpur or Johor Bahru in Malaysia. Terminating the venture would cost the company S$1.2 million.

Unable to find a suitable site at which to continue operations, Singapore Ducktours dismantled the DHL Balloon in October 2008.

== Ride ==
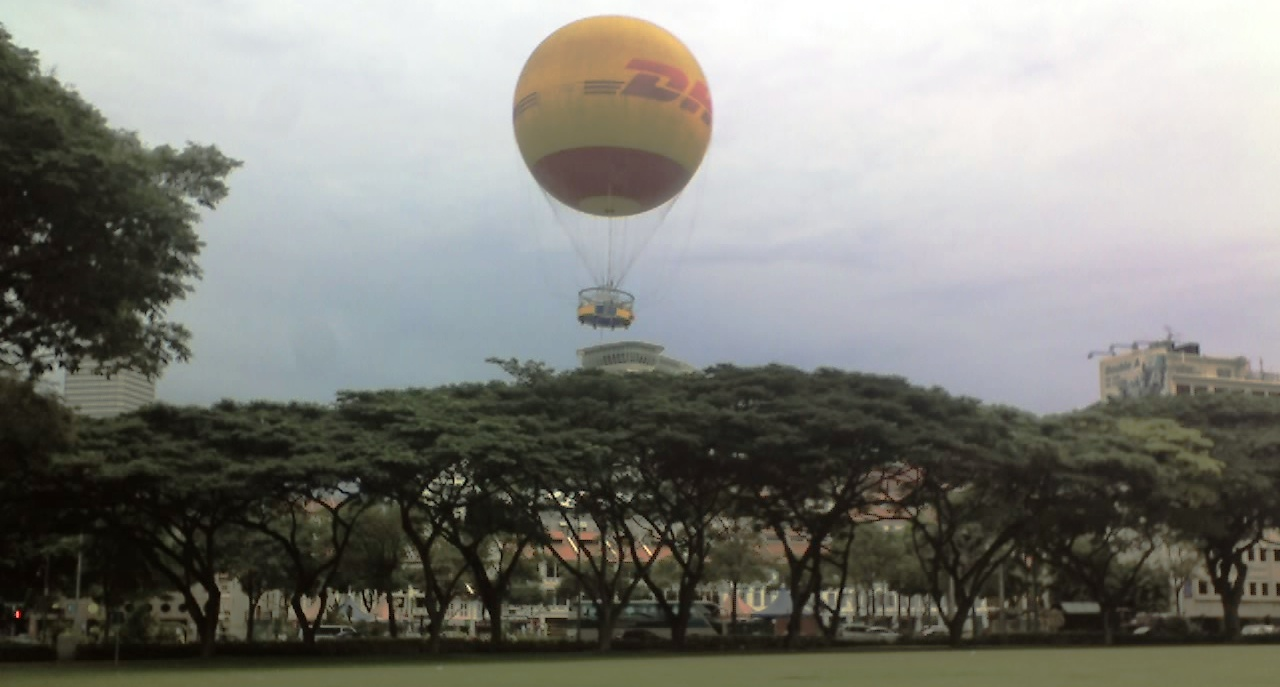
The DHL Balloon taking-off

Passengers could ride the DHL Balloon and have a view of Singapore's Central Area, including the central business district, Suntec City, Marina Bay, Orchard Road and Little India, and could see Indonesia and Malaysia. Standard flights to 150 metres (490 ft) typically lasted between 7 and 10 minutes, and slightly higher level flights to 180 metres (590 ft) extended the time to about 13 minutes.

== Features and specifications ==
The DHL Balloon measured 22 metres (72 ft) in diameter and was filled with 6,500 cubic metres (8,500 cu yd) of helium. It was certified as an aircraft. It was one of only fifteen similar balloons around the world in cities including Paris and Hong Kong made by Aerophile.

As the balloon was anchored to the ground with a metal cable, it was only able to ascend and descend vertically. It was approved by the Civil Aviation Authority of Singapore to ascend to a maximum altitude of 180 metres (590 ft), or around 48 stories. Flights to either 150 or 180 metres (490 or 590 ft) were offered. It could accommodate a maximum of 29 passengers in its gondola.

=== Piloting ===
The balloon, which flew between two and six times every hour, was operated by a pilot within the gondola. A hydro-electric winch system controlled take-off and landing. As a safety measure, the balloon was not flown when there was lightning, rain, or when the wind speed exceeded 5 knots on the ground (roughly 9 km/h; 6 mph) as measured by an anemometer.

=== Maintenance ===
A crew of six pilots worked in rotation with one on duty at any one time. They conducted routine checks daily, weekly and every three months on the balloon and its equipment. The helium was replenished every four to six months and engineers visited the balloon each year to conduct an inspection.

== See also ==
- Singapore Flyer
