= Queen Street, Singapore =

Road in Singapore

Coordinates: 1°17′58″N 103°51′12″E

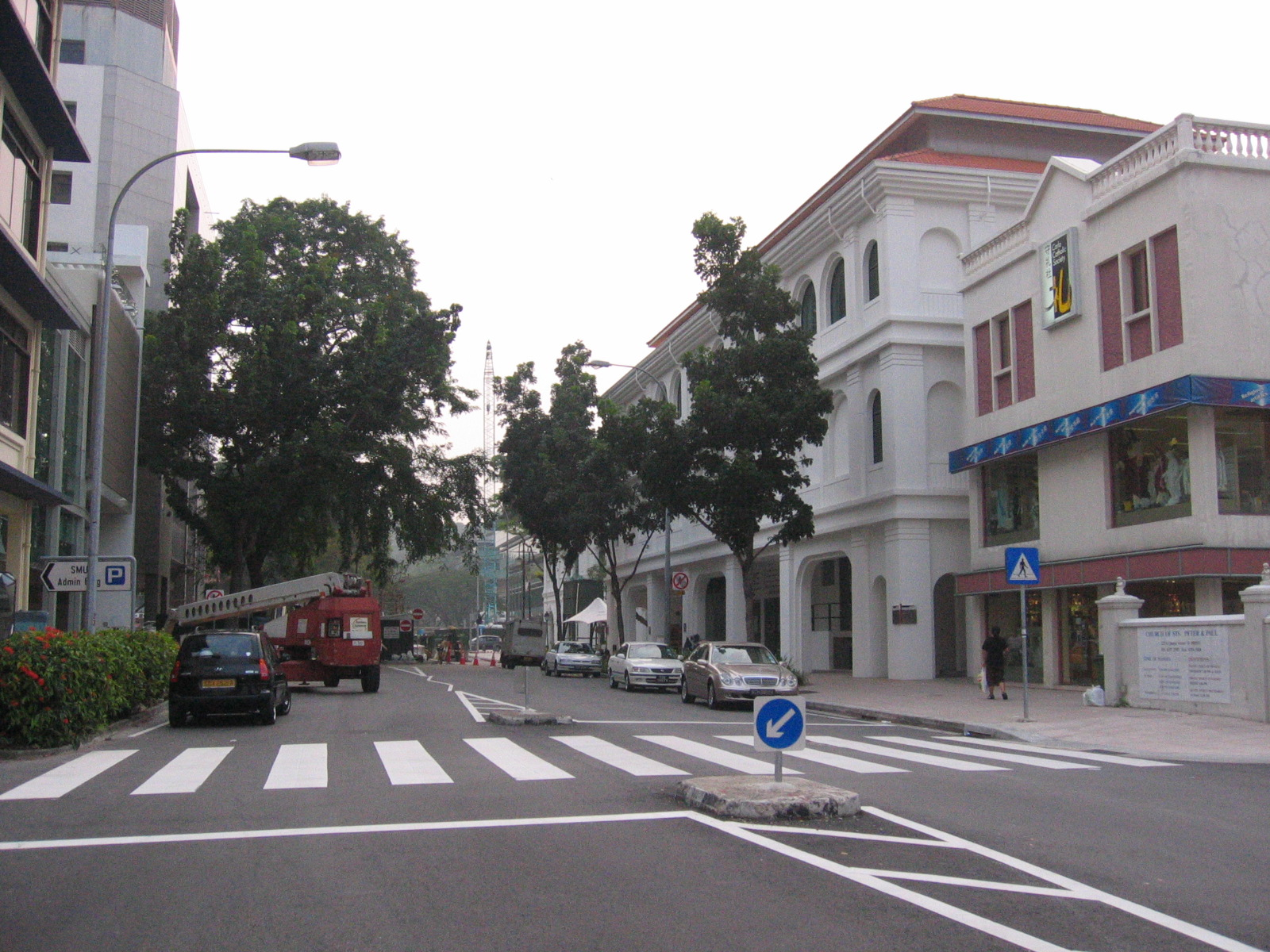
Queen Street

Queen Street (Note: Chinese: 奎因街, see "Other names" for different variations.) is one of the oldest streets in Singapore. With two completely separated sections, one spanning from Arab Street to Ophir Road and one spanning from Rochor Road to the junction of Stamford Road, Queen Street forms major junctions with Middle Road and Bras Basah Road.

== History ==
Queen Street is one of the country's oldest thoroughfares. It was formally named in 1848 in honour of Queen Victoria, marking the tenth year of her reign. However, the road's alignment was laid out much earlier and was referenced in the Jackson Plan.

The area around Stamford Canal, Dhoby Ghaut and Selegie Road was known for the laundry services provided by the dhobies (laundrymen) from the colonial days. Many schools such as the Raffles Girls' Secondary School, Saint Joseph's Institution and the Catholic High School used to be located here.

The section between Ophir Road and Rochor Road was permanently closed on 1 September 2024 for North-South Corridor construction works.

=== Other names ===
Queen Street was known as Sa Beh Lor, meaning "Third Horse Carriageway", in Singaporean Hokkien. This nickname formed part of a numerical system commonly used by early local Chinese speakers to refer to the city's key streets. This sequence included North Bridge Road as "Toa Beh Lor" (First Horse Carriageway), Victoria Street as "Ji Beh Lor" (Second Horse Carriageway), Waterloo Street as "Si Beh Lor" (Fourth Horse Carriageway), Bencoolen Street as "Gor Beh Lor" (Fifth Horse Carriageway), Prinsep Street as "Lak Beh Lor" (Sixth Horse Carriageway) and Selegie Road as "Chit Beh Lor" (Seventh Horse Carriageway).

Queen Street was also colloquially known as Sek A Ni Koi, a Hokkien rendition of the Malay term for Eurasians/Serani, reflecting the presence of a significant Eurasian community in the area. Other Chinese names include San Ma Lu, which has the similar definition in Hokkien but in Mandarin, and Se Zai Nian Jie, also referring to its status as a Eurasian enclave. In Tamil, the place was referred to as Dhoby Kampam and Vannan Teruvu, both of which mean "street of dhobies", which reflected the prominence of Indian laundrymen in the district during the colonial era. Similarly, in Malay, it was called Kampong Dhobi, again referencing the dhobi or laundry trade that characterised the neighbourhood.

== Churches and hotels ==
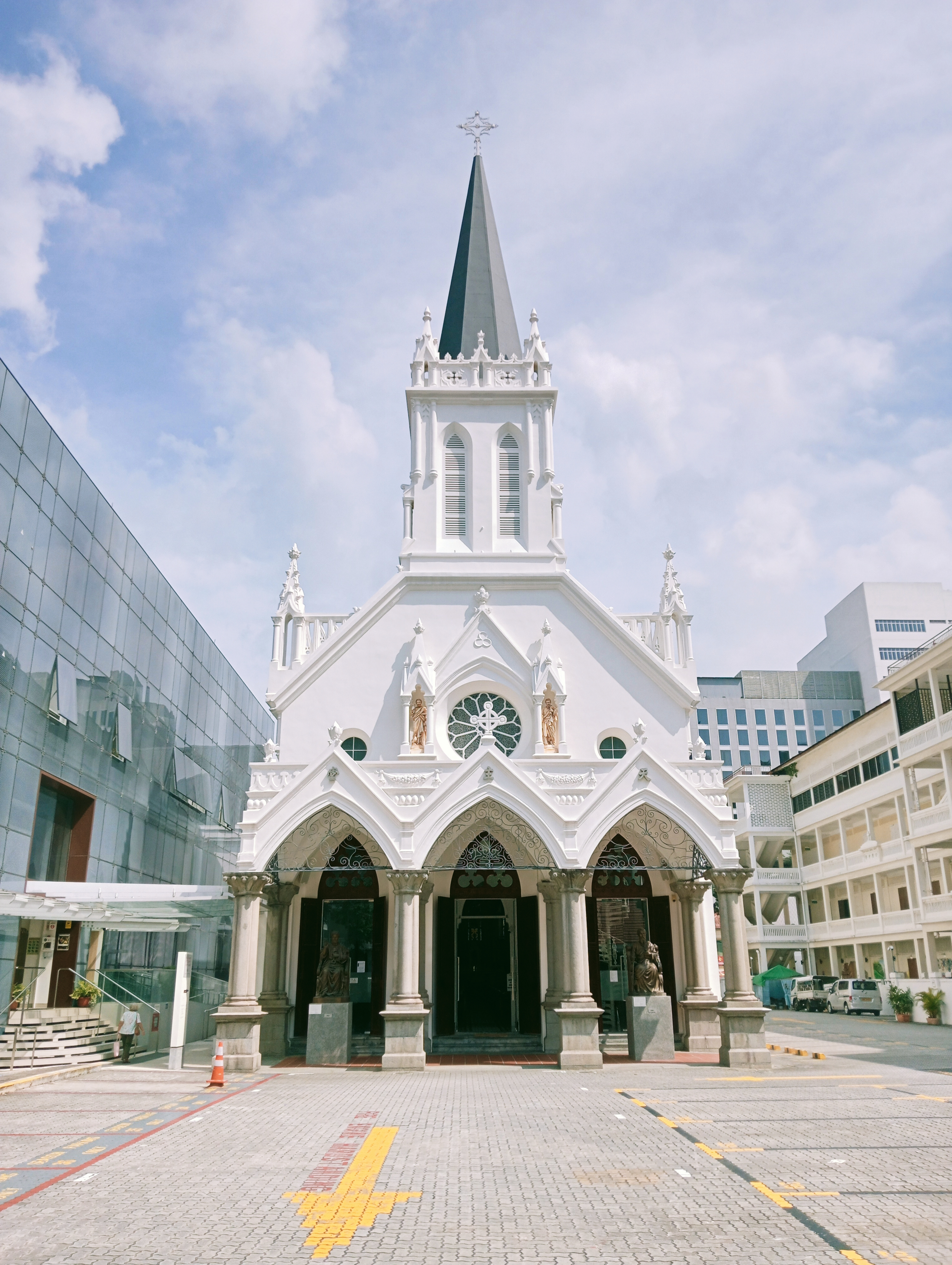
Church of Saints Peter and Paul

Queen Street is known for the many churches that line it. The oldest Roman Catholic church still in existence, the Cathedral of the Good Shepherd, was built in 1847 with the churches of Saint Joseph's, Saints Peter and Paul and Our Lady of Lourdes following after. Other churches on this street include Kum Yan Methodist Church and Grace Singapore Chinese Church. The Central Sikh temple, the oldest in Singapore, which was built on Queen Street in the 1930s, was pulled down in the 1980s to make way for new development and moved to Towner Road. Flats and shops were built on its original site of Queen Street. In June 2016, the Church of Saints Peter and Paul re-opened after completion of a one-year and $8 million restoration. The church, which was listed as a national monument in 2003, had cracks in the walls, a leaking roof, and termites. Because of the historic status of the church, the roof had to be repaired according to the original design; hundreds of nuts and bolts were used rather than welding.

Other buildings on this street include the Oxford Hotel, BOC Plaza, Mercure Singapore Bugis, Bugis+, Albert Centre Market and Food Centre, Fu Lu Shou Complex and some shophouses. Queen Street Bus Terminal, which hosts cross-border services to and from Johor Bahru, is also located there. On 7 November 2015, an 11-storey China Cultural Centre opened. The building is part of an effort to encourage exchanges of art and culture between China and Singapore.

== Arts and culture district ==
In 2014, the section of Queen Street between Bras Basah Road and Middle Road underwent substantial renovation as part of a project to develop the area into an arts and cultural district. Parking spots were removed, sidewalks were widened and benches installed in an effort to create space for holding public events, including in front of the Singapore Art Museum (SAM) and the Waterloo Centre.
