= Bencoolen Street =

Street in Singapore

Coordinates: 1°18′02″N 103°51′06″E

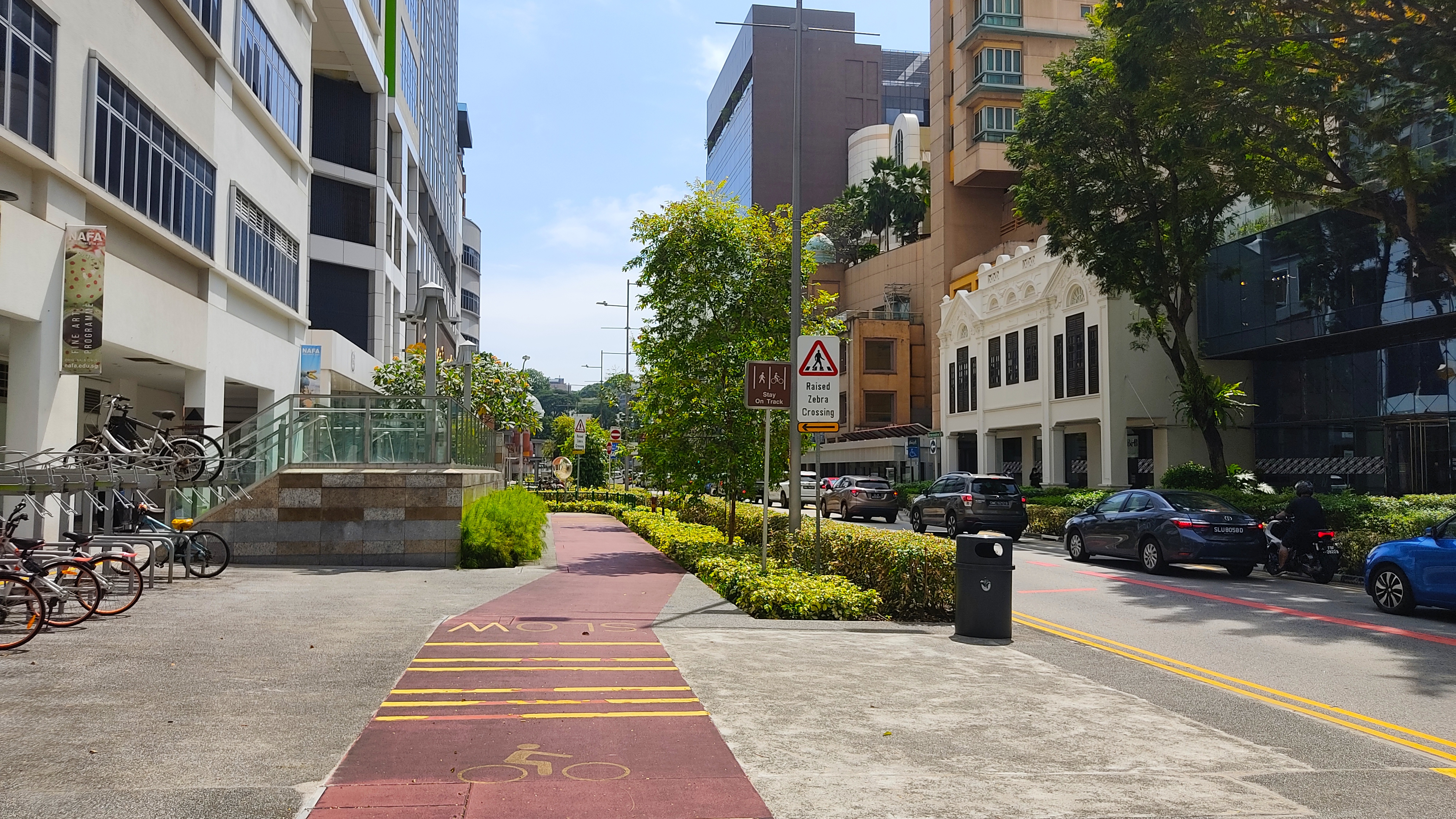
Bencoolen Street

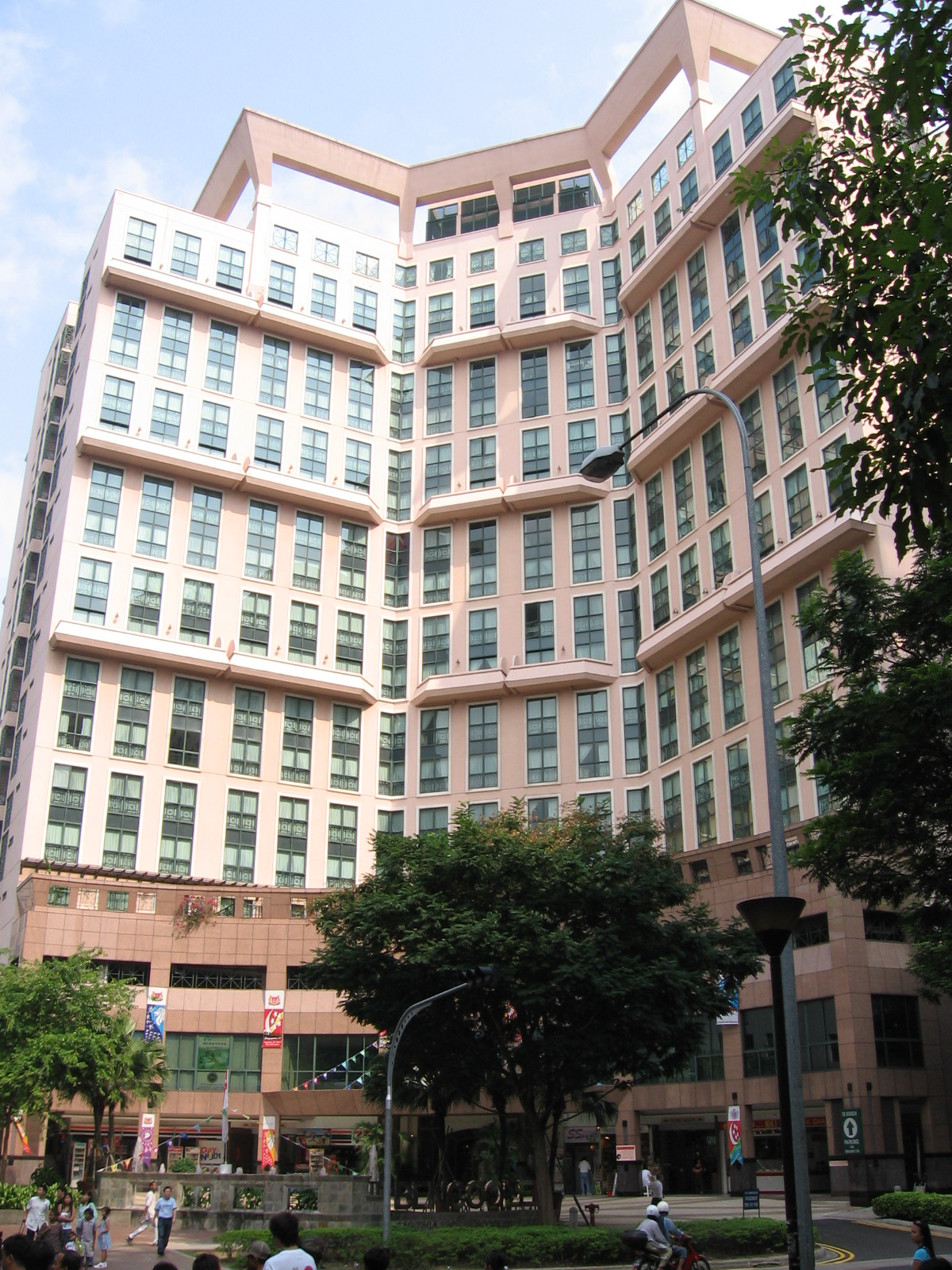
The Bencoolen on Bencoolen Street is a residential and commercial development.

Bencoolen Street is a street in Singapore, that starts at the junction of Rochor Road, Rochor Canal Road and Jalan Besar and ends at the junction of Fort Canning Road, Stamford Road and Orchard Road. The street houses several landmarks, including Sim Lim Square, Bencoolen Mosque and Albert Complex. A number of hotels and serviced apartments exist, namely Summer View Hotel, Bayview Hotel Singapore, Hotel 81 Bencoolen, Strand Hotel, Rendezvous Hotel and Somerset Bencoolen. It is accessible via Bencoolen MRT station, which is located under Bencoolen Street itself.

== History ==
=== Naming ===
Bencoolen Street was known as Gor Beh Lor, meaning "Fifth Horse Carriageway", in Singaporean Hokkien. It was part of a group of historically significant roads that were each assigned a number and the term for horse, forming a practical numerical naming system among the Chinese communities. These roads included North Bridge Road as "Toa Beh Lor" (First Horse Carriageway), Victoria Street as "Ji Beh Lor" (Second Horse Carriageway), Queen Street as "Sa Beh Lor" (Third Horse Carriageway), Waterloo Street as "Si Beh Lor" (Fourth Horse Carriageway), Prinsep Street as "Lak Beh Lor" (Sixth Horse Carriageway) and Selegie Road as "Chit Beh Lor" (Seventh Horse Carriageway).

It was later renamed in remembrance of Raffles’s rule in British Bencoolen (of Sumatra) as Lieutenant-General, prior to the establishment of Singapore. It is also named after the accompanying entourage of Bengkulu Malays that followed him to Singapore and settled a Kampong around the area of Bencoolen Street, "Kampong Bencoolen". The non-anglicised name of Bencoolen is Bengkulu and is now a province of Indonesia.
