= The New 7th Storey Hotel =

- 七层楼酒店
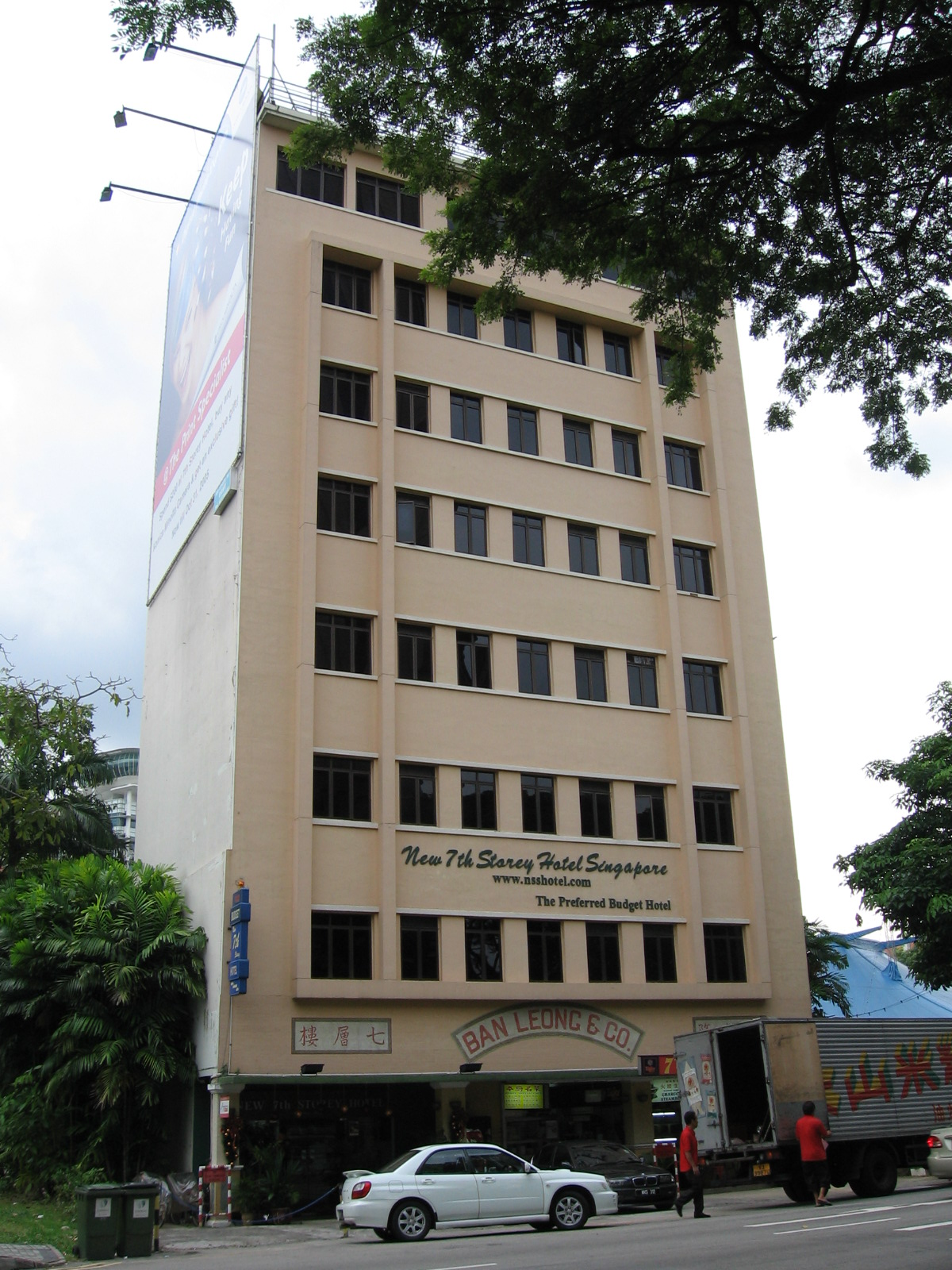

- Location within Singapore

General information
- Status: Demolished
- Type: Medium-rise Hotel
- Location: Downtown Core, Singapore, 229 Rochor Road, Singapore 188452
- Coordinates: 1°17′56.7″N 103°51′24.8″E
- Construction started: 1953; 73 years ago
- Completed: 1953; 73 years ago
- Opening: 1953; 73 years ago
- Demolished: 2009; 17 years ago
- Owner: Wee Thiam Siew (former); Ban Leong and Co. (former)

Technical details
- Floor count: 9
- Lifts/elevators: 1

Other information
- Number of rooms: 38
- Number of restaurants: 1 (7th Storey Hainan Kitchen Charcoal Steamboat)
- Facilities: self-service laundry Internet stations beer garden

Website
- nsshotel.com

The New 7th Storey Hotel was a demolished budget hotel once located on Rochor Road in the Downtown Core of Singapore.

== History ==
The New 7th Storey Hotel was established in 1953. The founder of the hotel, Wee Thiam Siew, spotted the potential for a hotel business on its current site in the early 1950s. Wee also owned the Ban Leong Group. At that time, there was an influx of immigrants and European businessmen.

The then five-star hotel did well and became prominent. It was the tallest standing structure in the Beach Road area, and offered panoramic views of the beach. It was commonly used as a landmark by drivers to locate the lower Rochor vicinity. With the advent of land reclamation in the 1970s and 1980s, the seascapes gave way to flyovers. Following urbanisation directives, shophouses, a Chinese temple and pasar malam markets in the hotel's immediate surroundings were also pulled down. In the 1990s, the development of the high-rise skyscrapers in Marina Centre such as the Suntec City obscured the sea view that the hotel once enjoyed.

In the 1950s and 1960s, the building's top floor was the site of cha cha parties thrown by post-war British officers and graced by Singapore's veteran singer S. K. Poon. After Singapore's independence in 1965, most of the hotel's guests were traders from India and Indonesia. Since the Asian economic crisis of 1997, fewer traders have been putting themselves up at the hotel's rooms. Most guests now are backpackers from Europe and North America.

Wee and his family ran the business for about a decade before it went into other hands. In 1995 the Wee family took back ownership of the hotel and it was run by the third generation of the Wee family until the end of 2008. The hotel continued to be popular due to its proximity to shopping belts like Bugis Street and Orchard Road, and historical landmarks such as the national monuments located in the nearby Museum Planning Area.

== Facilities and features ==
Despite its name, The New 7th Storey Hotel was actually nine storeys high. It had 38 rooms catering to backpackers and the independent travellers. Facilities included a restaurant named 7th Storey Hainan Kitchen Charcoal Steamboat, self-service laundry services, Internet stations and a beer garden.

The hotel's history was reflected through its architecture and furniture, many of which were relics still in use till demolition. Distinctive features included a manually operated lift and its exterior spiral staircase.

== Demolition ==
It was announced on 26 June 2008 that the hotel will be demolished to make way for the new Bugis MRT station for the Downtown MRT line. The hotel's owner and occupants had to move out of the premises by the end of December 2008. The hotel was demolished in 2009.
