= Bugis+ =

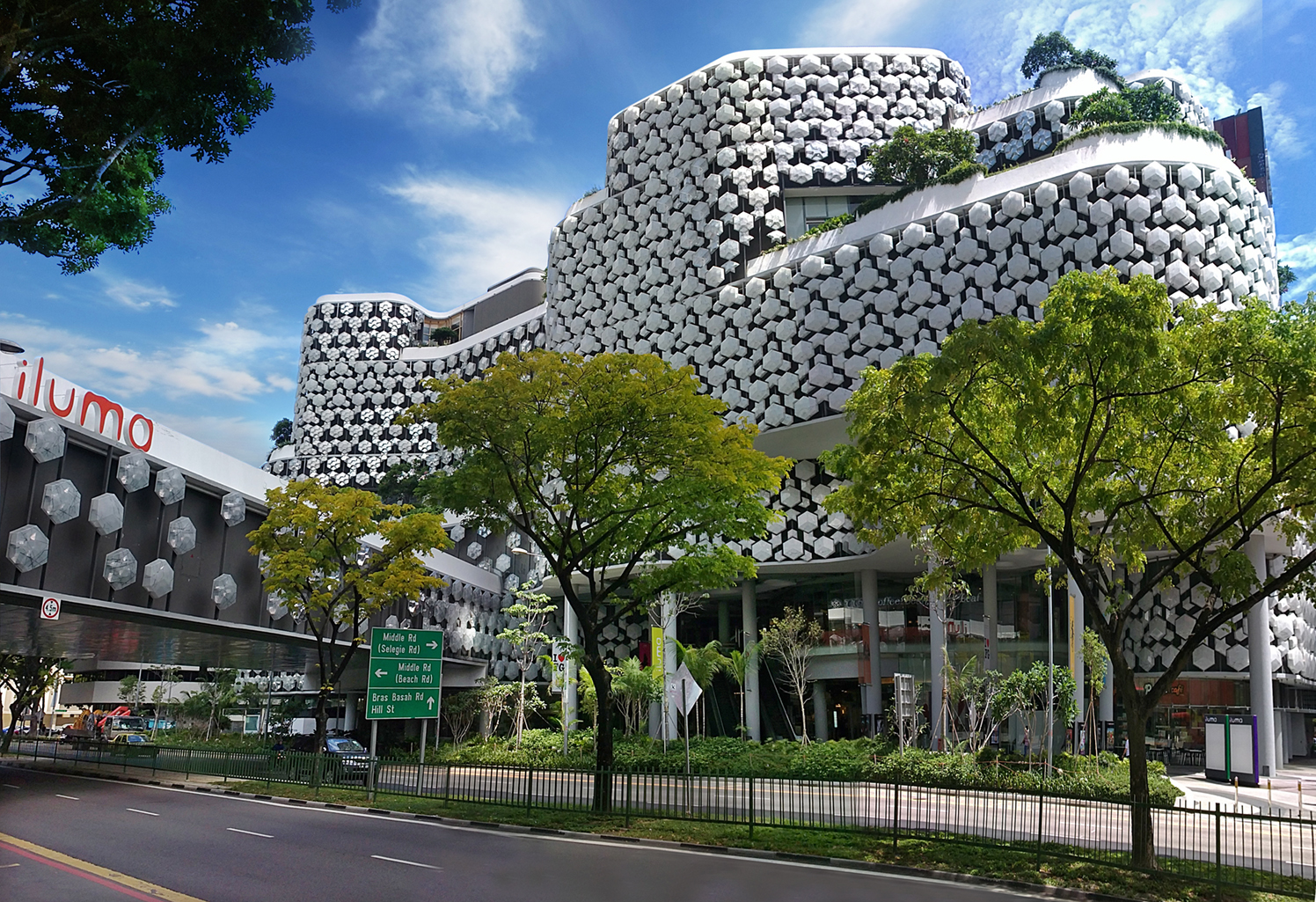
- Street view of Bugis+
- Location: Bugis, Singapore
- Coordinates: 1.299617°N 103.854408°E
- Address: 201 Victoria Street
- Opened: 1 June 2009 (as Iluma)
- Manager: CapitaMalls Asia
- Owner: CapitaMall Trust
- Architect: WOHA
- Num. of stores: More than 150
- Num. of anchor tenants: 5
- Floor area: 194,306 square feet (18,051.6 m^{2})
- Floors: 10
- Public transit: EW12 DT14 Bugis
- Website: www.capitaland.com/sg/malls/bugisplus/en.html

Bugis+ (pronounced as Bugis Plus), formerly Iluma, is a 10-storey shopping mall located 5 minutes from Bugis MRT station. It is located within the Bugis district of Singapore and opened on 28 March 2009.

== Building ==
Designed by WOHA, the facade of the mall plays with the theme of light and illumination, having high-tech features such as a light- and media facade designed by WOHA in conjunction with Berlin based media artists realities:united.

The "crystal mesh" facade envelops the convex part of the building and brightly lit billboards will scatter across its flatter sides, unlike those in the Times Square. Its theme was inspired by its proximity to arts venues and tertiary institutions.

== History ==
The opening of Iluma in 2009, was greeted with much fanfare. However, after several months, tenants started complaining about the lack of patrons, even though it is located just beside the busy Bugis Street.

The management tried to draw in patrons by calling in international artistes such as David Archuleta and Trace Bundy. Despite their efforts, the mall still had low patronage and many tenants were forced to shut down their stores.

In 2011, CapitaMall Trust Management announced that they had acquired Iluma from Jack Investments for S$295 million. As part of the transfer, the mall was revamped in late 2011 and was completed in mid-2012. The mall was renamed as Bugis+. The bridge connecting Bugis Junction, which is also owned by CapitaMall Trust Management, that previously did not provide direct access to Bugis Junction, now provided seamless connection.

In April 2012, CapitaMall announced that the mall will be renamed to Bugis+. On 8 June, Uniqlo, a Japanese casual wear retail chain, opened its biggest outlet in Singapore there.

In June 2025, Sidemen's SIDES opened its first international fast-food restaurant in Singapore. and six months later in December, Chick-fil-A opened its first store in Singapore after they did a pop-up last year.

== See also ==
- List of shopping malls in Singapore
