= Fu Lu Shou Complex =

Shopping center in Bugis, Singapore

- 福祿壽
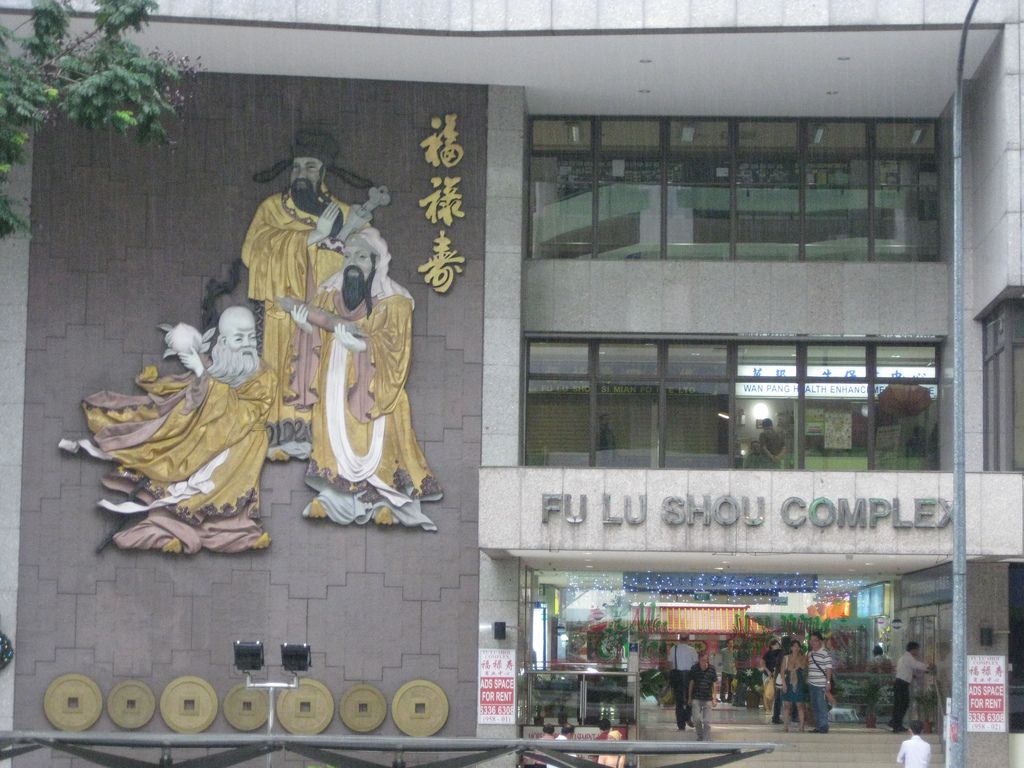
- Fu Lu Shou Complex in Bugis, Singapore
- Location: Rochor, Singapore
- Coordinates: 1°18′05.8″N 103°51′15.8″E
- Address: 149 Rochor Road, Singapore 188425
- Opened: 1983
- Num. of stores: 140
- Floors: 5 (1 basement level)
- Website: Official website

Fu Lu Shou Complex is a shopping centre built in 1983 located at Bugis, Singapore that specialises in Daoist and Buddhist religious paraphernalia.

== Background ==
Like other Singapore malls which cater to a specific commercial market, the Fu Lu Shou Complex gathered together many tenants selling similar items; here tenants purvey items such as lucky stones and gems, ceramic religious icons, incense and so on. The mall is named after the Daoist concept of Fu Lu Shou, meaning, respectively, good fortune (fu, 福), prosperity (lu, 祿) and longevity (shou, 壽), clearly signalling its specialisation to consumers.

While it houses many solely commercial ventures, the Fu Lu Shou Complex is particularly notable in that it also contains functioning religious shrines integrated into certain stores. In their usage of the complex as a source of religious wares and as a site of religious practice, the tenants and consumers here blur the line between mall and temple. Thus, in visiting the Fu Lu Shou Complex, Chinese religion practitioners can obtain both religious paraphernalia and blessings from propitiated deities.

== Gallery ==
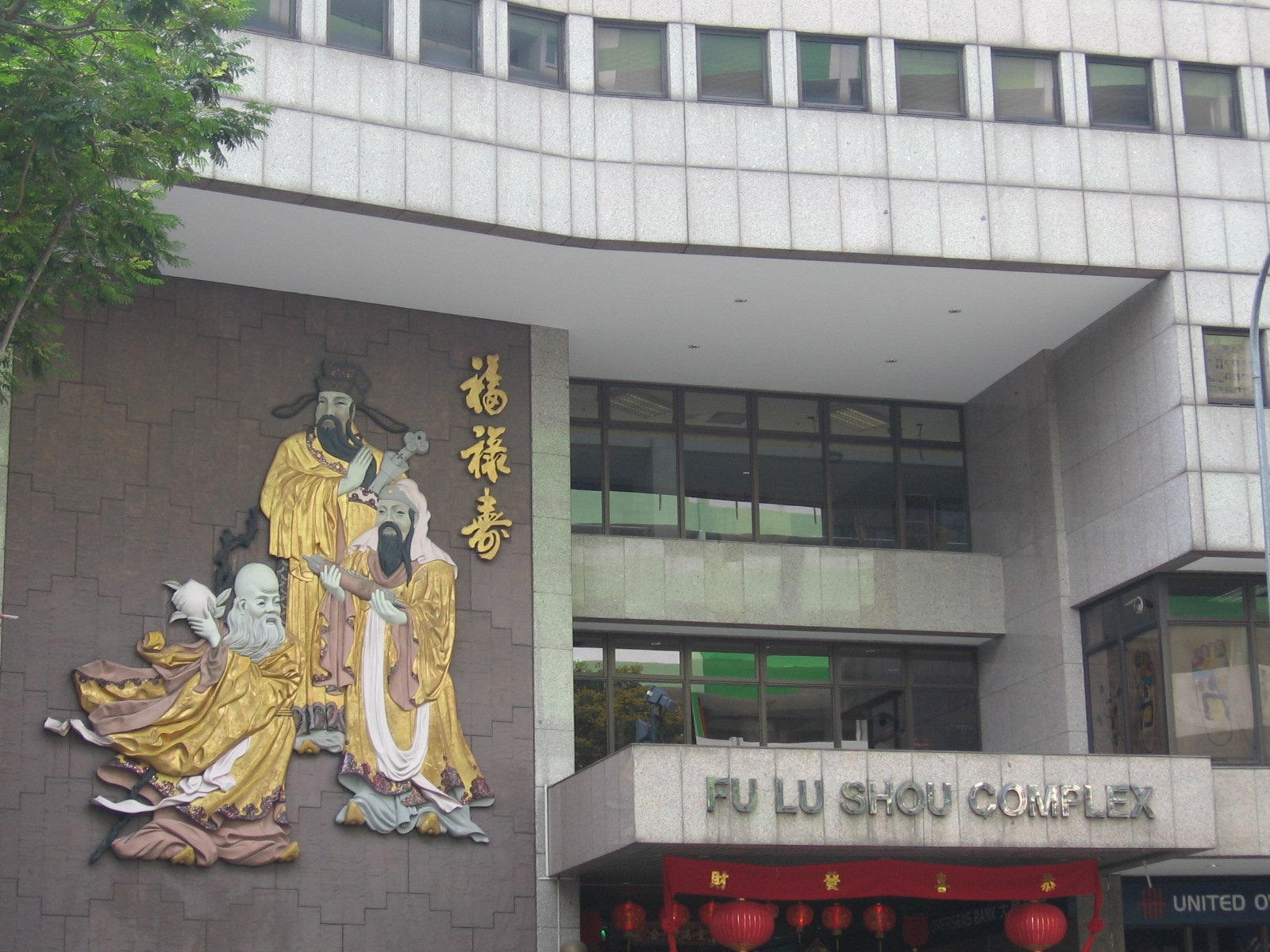

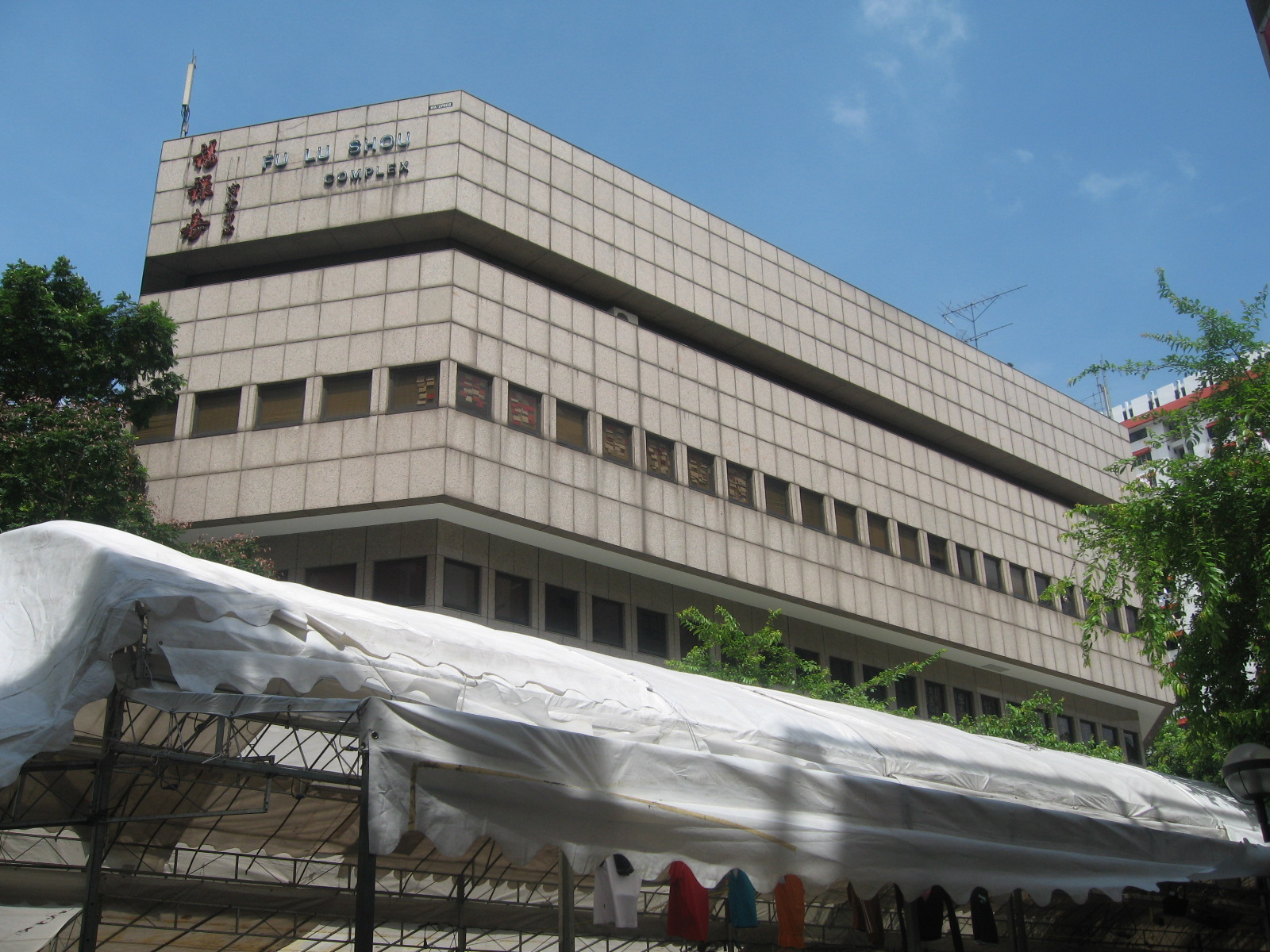

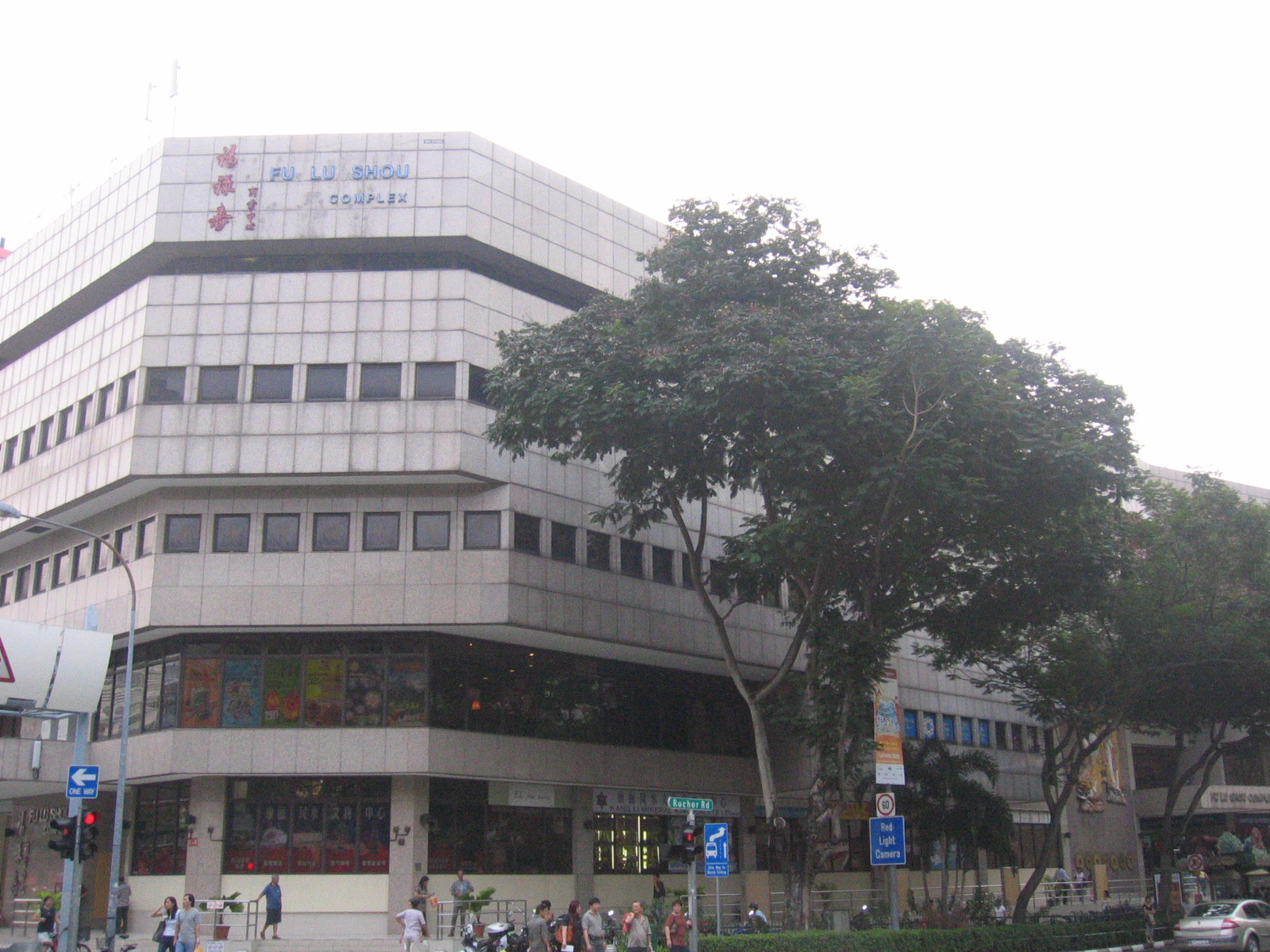

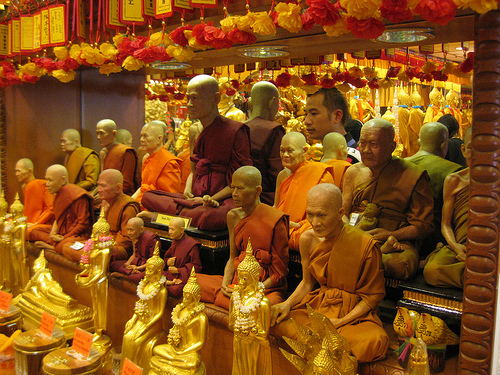
Buddhist icons

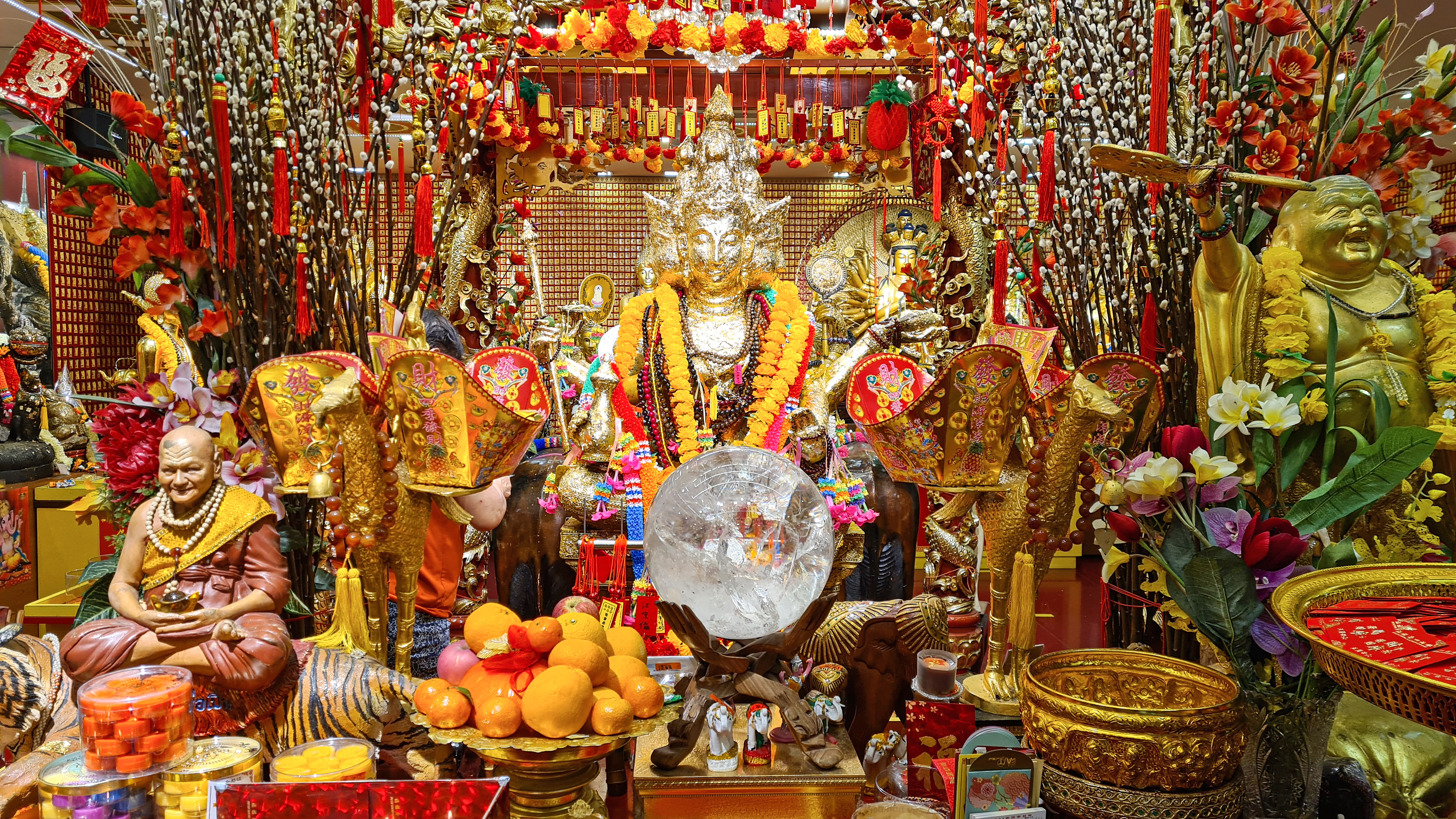
Indoor Phra Phrom Shrine.
