= North Bridge Road =

Road in Singapore

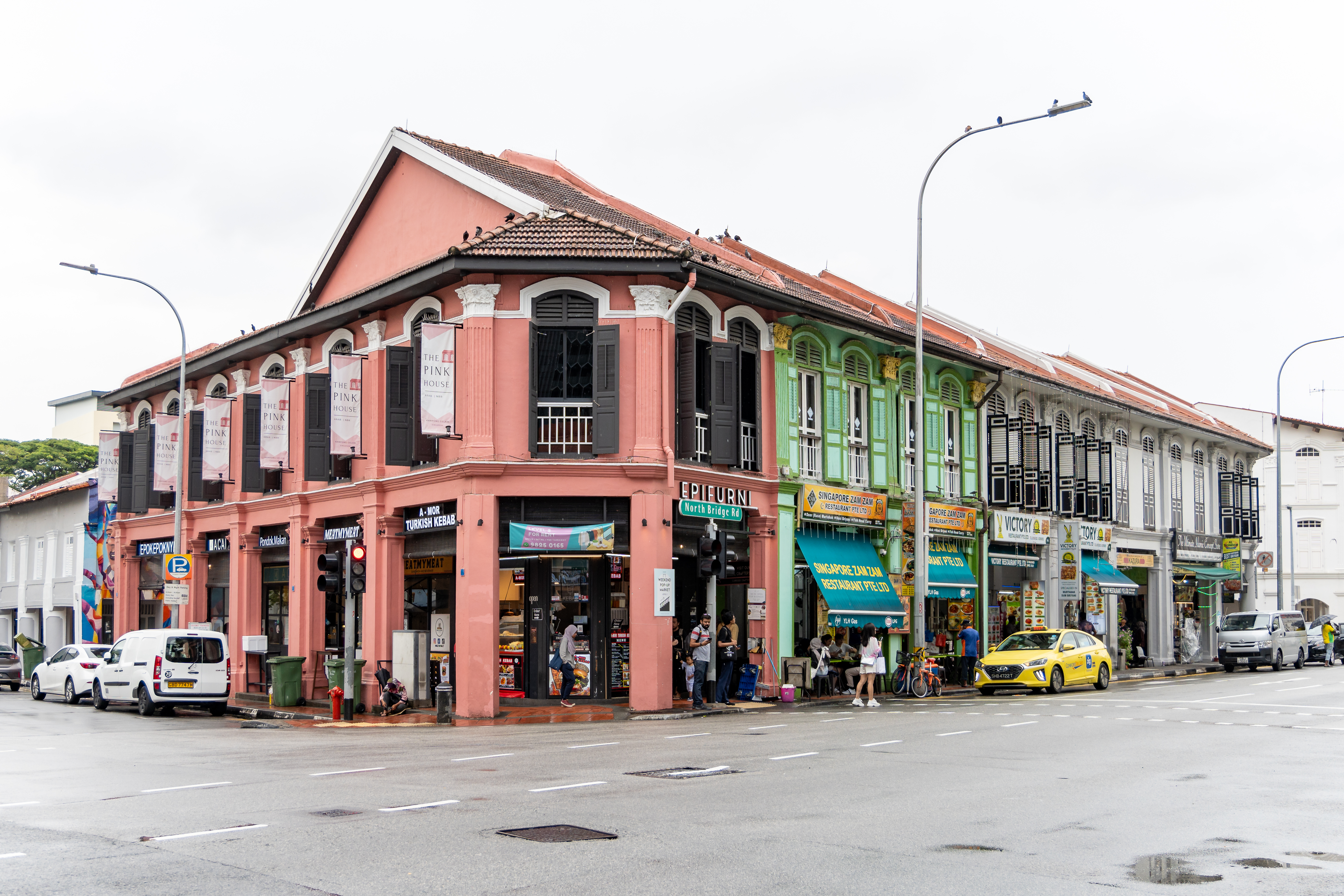
- North Bridge Road at the Kampong Glam area

Route information
- Length: 2.7 km (1.7 mi)
- Existed: 1830s–present

Major junctions
- Northern end: Crawford Street
- Southern end: Elgin Bridge

Location
- Country: Singapore

Highway system
- Transport in Singapore

North Bridge Road (Note: Chinese: 桥北路. There is no official translation (not transliteration) in Malay or Tamil, and the English name is retained in its original form in both languages.) is a major one-way road in Singapore, located to the north of the Singapore River. It begins at the junction with Crawford Street in Kallang, situated on the western bank of the Rochor River, and runs in a southwesterly direction until it reaches Elgin Bridge. Beyond the bridge, the road continues as South Bridge Road on the southern side of the river. Along its course, North Bridge Road passes through the planning areas of Kallang, Rochor and the Downtown Core.

== History ==
North Bridge Road is among the oldest roads in Singapore and was part of the original Jackson Plan, which laid out the framework for the colonial town in the early nineteenth century. It was constructed between 1833 and 1835 under the supervision of George Drumgoole Coleman, the first Government Superintendent of Public Works. The road was built using penal labour from Indian convicts who were brought to Singapore during the British colonial period. These convicts were commonly employed in public works projects, such as roads, bridges and buildings, contributing significantly to the colony's early infrastructure. North Bridge Road originally connected the European town centre to the outlying settlements, and its alignment formed a key axis within the early urban layout.

Throughout the years, North Bridge Road has undergone several transformations. In the twentieth century, it became a major route for public transport, serving trams and trolley buses that operated across the city. The road was long maintained as a one-way street in the southbound direction, until changes to the traffic system were implemented. On 11 April 1993, Victoria Street was converted into a two-way road, prompting a reconfiguration of surrounding traffic flows, including that of North Bridge Road.

=== Naming ===
North Bridge Road was historically referred to as the "Big Horseway" or "Main Horse Carriageway", known in Hokkien as Toa Beh Lor. "Toa", "Beh" and "Lor" is how "big", horse and "road/path" is pronounced in Singaporean Hokkien, and this name marked the road as the starting point in a locally used numerical system for identifying the main streets of early Singapore. The roads that followed in order were Victoria Street as "Ji Beh Lor" (Second Horse Carriageway), Queen Street as "Sa Beh Lor" (Third Horse Carriageway), (Note: Queen Street was also colloquially known as "Sek A Ni Koi", a Hokkien rendition of the Malay term for Eurasians, Serani, reflecting the presence of a significant Eurasian community in the area.) Waterloo Street as "Si Beh Lor" (Fourth Horse Carriageway), Bencoolen Street as "Gor Beh Lor" (Fifth Horse Carriageway), Prinsep Street as "Lak Beh Lor" (Sixth Horse Carriageway) and Selegie Road as "Chit Beh Lor" (Seventh Horse Carriageway). This naming convention arose due to the difficulty Chinese residents had in pronouncing English street names, and Hokkien had served as the lingua franca of the Chinese community in Singapore especially during the 19th and 20th centuries.

== Landmarks ==
- Bras Basah Complex
- Bugis Junction
- Capitol Building
- CHIJMES
- City Hall MRT station
- Funan
- Istana Kampong Glam (Malay Heritage Centre)
- Masjid Sultan
- National Library
- Parkview Square
- Parliament House
- Peninsula Plaza
- Raffles Hospital
- Raffles Hotel
- Raffles City
- Saint Andrew's Cathedral
- Supreme Court
- The Treasury
