= National monuments of Singapore =

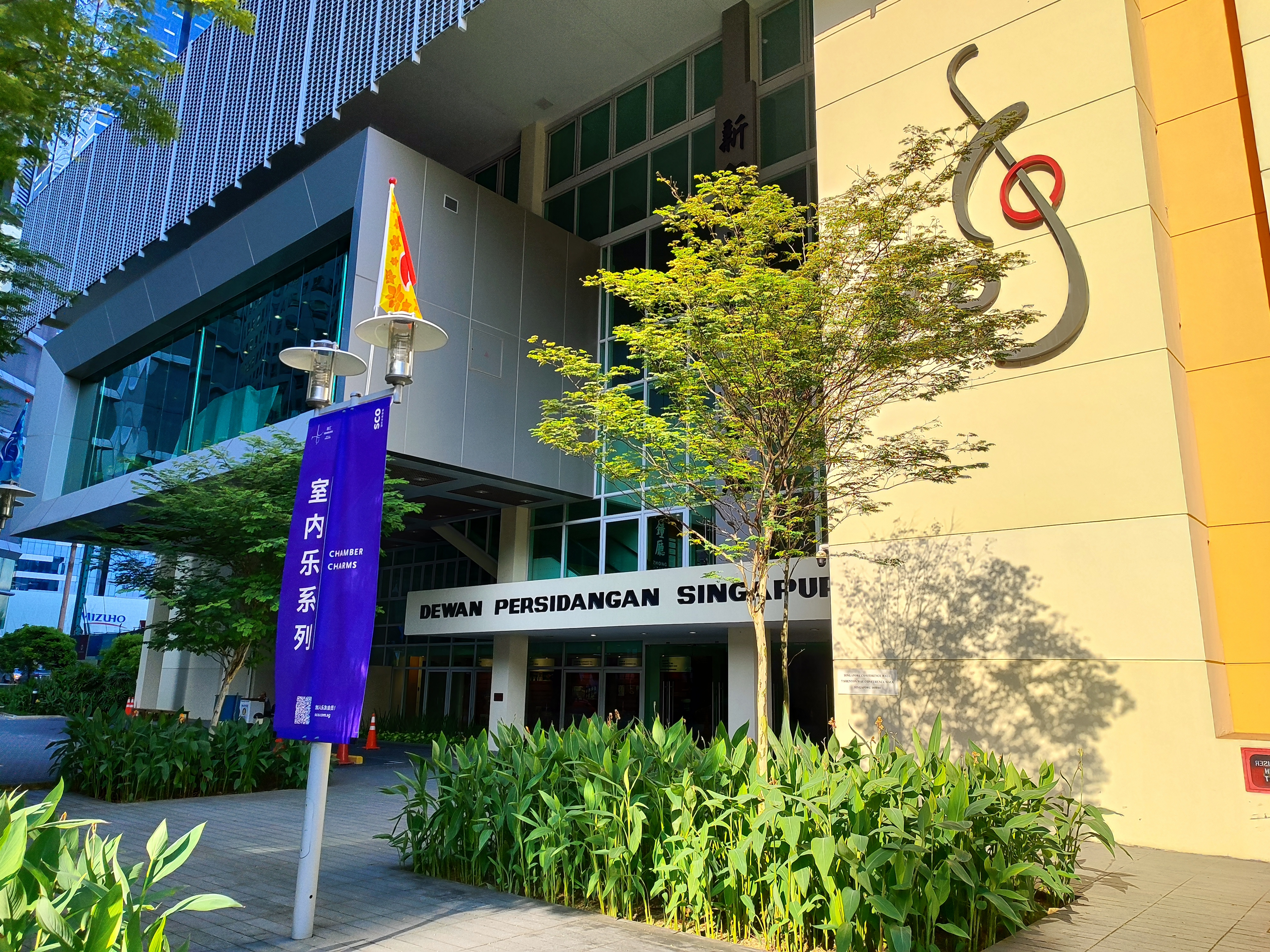
The Singapore Conference Hall, a national monument of Singapore

The National Monuments of Singapore (Note: Malay: Monumen Negara Singapura, Chinese: 新加坡国家古迹, Tamil: சிங்கப்பூர் தேசிய நினைவுச் சின்னங்கள்) are sites, buildings and structures in Singapore that have been designated by the National Heritage Board (NHB) as possessing exceptional historic, traditional, archaeological, architectural or artistic merit to the country. These monuments are legally protected from demolition due to their cultural and historical significance, including associations with pivotal events such as the founding of modern Singapore, the Second World War, the independence of Singapore, and the nation's early development. The Preservation of Monuments Act empowers the NHB to oversee the preservation of these landmarks and encourages research as well as public engagement with Singapore's architectural heritage.

The framework for designating national monuments was established under the Preservation of Monuments Act, enacted in December 1970. The act provided for the identification and legal protection of culturally significant sites, leading to the formation of the Preservation of Monuments Board (PMB) in April 1972. This body was tasked with enforcing the act amidst growing concern over the loss of heritage buildings due to rapid urban redevelopment. By mid-1973, forty sites were shortlisted for preservation and public suggestions were invited to expand the list. The initial batch of eight designated landmarks included the Thong Chai Medical Institution, Armenian Church, St Andrew's Cathedral, Telok Ayer Market, Thian Hock Keng Temple, Sri Mariamman Temple, Fatimah Mosque and the Cathedral of the Good Shepherd. In 2021, amendments were proposed to expand the act's definition to include open spaces, inland waters and any land area associated with human activity, both past and present.

The NHB, a statutory board under the Ministry of Culture, Community and Youth within the Government of Singapore, is responsible for gazetting and maintaining national monuments. As of date, 83 structures have been gazetted of which 77 are formally recognised as national monuments. These include religious sites, civic buildings, marketplaces and other culturally significant landmarks across the island. The most recent addition to the list is 38 Oxley Road, which was officially gazetted on 12 December 2025. A comprehensive and regularly updated list of these monuments is accessible via the NHB's heritage portal.

== List of national monuments ==
Building name	Usage as of 2025	Details	Location (Note: The addresses of each monument are taken from each monument's entry on ROOTS. Most of their coordinates are taken from OneMap, an interactive map published by the Singapore Land Authority (SLA), except for the following, which were taken from Google Maps as they are not listed on OneMap: Caldwell House)	Date completed	Date gazetted
38 Oxley Road	House	An eight bedroom two storey bungalow near Orchard Road. Lee Kuan Yew and his family moved into the residence after World War II, with his wife Kwa Geok Choo taking up residence there in 1950. Meetings of the People's Action Party (PAP) were regularly held in the basement in 1954. The building continued to serve as Lee's home throughout his tenure as prime minister, and his first born son, the third prime minister of Singapore Lee Hsien Loong, was raised there. Following Singapore's separation from Malaysia in 1965, fortifications and a guardhouse were added. Prior to Lee Kuan Yew's death in 2015, he expressed his intention for the house to be demolished, a position later shared by his daughter, Lee Wei Ling, who died in 2024, as well as his other son, Lee Hsien Yang. However, the government opposed the plan and subsequently gazetted it as a national monument in 2025. It remains undetermined as to which parts of the house would be demolished or retained since its elevation into a national monument. Any sort of demolition will make it the second after the Cathay Building to have parts of its structure demolished.	Orchard	1898	12 December 2025
Anderson Bridge	Bridge	Opened in 1910, the steel truss girder bridge spans 204 feet (62 m) and was constructed to ease traffic on the Cavenagh Bridge. It is named after Sir John Anderson, the Governor of the Straits Settlement from 1904 to 1911.	Singapore River 1.28734°N 103.8531°E	1910	15 October 2019
Armenian Church	Church	The Armenian Church was opened in 1836 to serve the Armenian community during colonial Singapore. Designed by George D. Coleman, it resembles the Mother Church of the Armenian Apostolic Church in Etchmiadzin, Armenia. It is Singapore's oldest church.	60 Hill Street 1.29310°N 103.84940°E	1836	28 June 1973
Bowyer Block, Singapore General Hospital	Singapore General Hospital Museum	Opened in 1926 as the Upper Block, it was built as part of the new Singapore General Hospital (SGH). It was renamed to the Bowyer Block in post-World War II (WWII) in memory of Dr John H. Bowyer. The neoclassical building currently houses the Singapore General Hospital Museum and is the only remaining part of the original SGH.	11 Third Hospital Avenue 1.2806°N 103.8363°E	29 March 1926	11 November 2009
Caldwell House	Part of the CHIJMES complex	The Caldwell House was a bungalow for the French sisters of Convent of the Holy Infant Jesus Chapel. Currently, the neoclassical building is part of CHIJMES, a shopping centre. It is the oldest building in the CHIJMES compound.	30 Victoria Street 1.29540°N 103.85234°E	1840–1841	26 October 1990
Cathay Building	Commercial	Opened in 1939, the Art Deco cinema was Singapore's first skyscraper and air-conditioned cinema. During the Japanese occupation of Singapore, it became an office for the Japanese Military Propaganda Department. As of 2025, it is the only national monument to have the building/structure demolished, but save for the façade of the original building remaining.	2 Handy Road 1.2993°N 103.8479°E	3 October 1939	10 February 2003
Cathedral of the Good Shepherd	Church	One of Singapore's oldest cathedrals and the cathedral church for the Archbishop of Singapore.	4 Queen Street 1.29605°N 103.8513°E	1843–1847	28 June 1973
Cavenagh Bridge	Bridge	Cavenagh Bridge is Singapore's oldest suspension bridge and the last major work of Indian convicts. Prior to the bridge, people had to take a ferry to cross the Singapore River, with a temporary toll bridge replacing the ferry at some point. It is named after Sir William O. Cavenagh, the Governor of the Straits Settlement from 1859 to 1867.	Singapore River 1.2866°N 103.8524°E	1869	15 October 2019
The Cenotaph	War memorial	A war memorial dedicated to those who died in World War I (WWI) and WWII. Initially opened in 1922 to honour those from the Colony of Singapore who came to fight in Europe during WWI, the reverse side of the monument was dedicated to those who died defending Singapore and in WW2. It is based on The Cenotaph in Whitehall, London.	Connaught Drive 1.29023°N 103.85377°E	1922	28 December 2010
Central Fire Station	Fire station	Completed in 1909, it is Singapore's oldest surviving fire station. It was built under the recommendation of the then-Superintendent of the Singapore Fire Brigade. Firefighters from the fire station responded to various post-WWII and post-independence emergencies such as the Bukit Ho Swee fire and Collapse of Hotel New World. The 'blood-and-bandage' (Note: An architectural style popularised in the Edwardian Era featuring red bricks as the 'blood' and plaster layovers as the 'bandage') building is still operational.	62 Hill Street 1.2920452°N 103.8491541°E	1908	18 December 1998
Changi Prison, Old Entrance Gate, Turret and Wall	Prison	Changi Prison started operations in 1937 as a maximum security prison in response to the then-ongoing prison overcrowding problem. During the Japanese Occupation of Singapore, it was used as a prisoner-of-war camp where the Double Tenth incident took place. Much of the original building was replaced by a new building except for the entrance gate, two corner turrets, and a 180 metres (200 yd) long wall.	Upper Changi Road North 1.3550915°N 103.9724259°E	1936	15 February 2016
Chesed-El Synagogue	Synagogue	The synagogue was built by Sir Manasseh Meyer in 1905 as the Maghain Aboth Synagogue was insufficient for the expanding Jewish population. It is currently one of two synagogues in Singapore, the other being the Maghain Aboth Synagogue.	2 Oxley Rise 1.297274°N 103.8426685°E	1905	18 December 1998
Chinese High School Clock Tower Building	Part of Hwa Chong Institution	Built between 1923 and 1925, the neoclassical clock tower was opened as part of The Chinese High School's (present day Hwa Chong Institution) Bukit Timah campus, the first secondary and high school specifically for the Chinese community in Singapore.	673 Bukit Timah Road 1.3263581°N 103.8032904°E	1925	19 March 1999
Chung Cheng High School (Main) Administration Building and Entrance Arch	School	Completed in 1968, the Administration Building of the Chung Cheng High School's Goodman Road Campus was constructed to provide modern educational facilities for students. Chung Cheng High School was one of the first schools accessible to Chinese youths. The building combines both traditional Chinese and modern architectural elements such as its double-tier Chinese roof.	50 Goodman Road 1.3048356°N 103.8907128°E	1965	10 July 2014
Church of Our Lady of Lourdes	Church	Opened in 1888, the neo-gothic church was constructed to cater to the then-expanding Tamil Catholic community. It is one of Singapore's oldest churches and still used to this day by different ethnicities.	50 Ophir Road 1.3029945°N 103.8561809°E	1888	14 January 2005
Church of Saints Peter and Paul	Church	Initially constructed to serve the growing Chinese and Tamil Catholic communities, it was designated as a church exclusively for the Chinese due to Church of Our Lady of Lourdes's nickname as "The Tamil Church". It is one of the oldest Catholic churches in Singapore.	225A Queen Street 1.29788°N 103.8512744°E	1869–1870	10 February 2003
Church of St Teresa	Church	Opened in 1929 to cater to Hokkien Catholics, it is the only Catholic building to be built have Romano-Byzantine architecture. The Church continues to be used by different ethnicities and houses the Singapore branch of the Apostle of the Sea, an international Catholic group for seafarers.	2 Bukit Purmei 1.2729857°N 103.8277913°E	7 April 1929	11 November 2009
Church of the Nativity of the Blessed Virgin Mary	Church	Built between 1898 and 1901, it was constructed to replace the Church of Saint Mary as the Teochew Catholic community in Hougang was expanding then. The Neo-Gothic church is one of the oldest churches in the suburbs of Singapore.	1259 Upper Serangoon Road 1.3735529°N 103.8982627°E	1901	14 January 2005
Civilian War Memorial	War memorial	Opened in 1967 by Prime Minister Lee Kuan Yew, the Civilian War Memorial is dedicated to those who died during the Japanese occupation of Singapore in WWII. It is known as the "Four Chopsticks" by locals due to its four columns which represent the four main ethnic groups of Singapore who died under Japanese occupation, being Chinese, Malays, Indians, and Eurasians.	War Memorial Park 1.2928954°N 103.854702°E	15 February 1967	15 August 2013
Former City Hall	Part of the National Gallery Singapore	Completed in 1929, it hosted Municipal Council. It was where Supreme Commander of the South East Asia Command Louis Mountbatten accepted the surrender of General Seishiro Itagaki in 1945. In 1959, it hosted Lee Kuan Yew's swearing as Singapore's first Prime Minister and the introductions of Singapore's national anthem "Majulah Singapura", state crest, and state flag. In 2015, the neoclassical-modernist building became part of the National Gallery Singapore along with the Former Supreme Court.	3 Saint Andrew's Road 1.2907516°N 103.8517689°E	1926–1929	14 February 1992
College of Medicine Building	Occupied by the Ministry of Health (MOH), Singapore Medical Council, and College of Family Physicians	The College of Medicine Building opened as The Straits and Federated Malay States Government Medical School in 1905. In 1913 it was renamed to King Edward VII Medical School after receiving a donation from the King Edward VII Memorial Fund the year prior, then subsequently renaming itself to be King Edward VII College of Medicine in 1921. The school was merged with Raffles College to create the University of Malaya and subsequently became the Faculty of Medicine. Currently, the Ministry of Health (MOH) Singapore Medical Council, and College of Family Physicians occupy the neoclassical building.	16 College Road 1.2907516°N 103.8517689°E	1926	2 December 2002
Convent of the Holy Infant Jesus Chapel	Part of the CHIJMES complex	Opened in 1903, the Anglo-French Gothic chapel was subsequently consecrated in 1904, where it became the "crowning glory of the [Convent of the Holy Infant Jesus in Singapore]". The chapel features a five-storey spire and a series of stained-glass windows made by Jules Dobbelaere, a European craftsman. Particularly, the chapel's apse features a series of windows showcasing Jesus's life, with its nave featuring the Twelve Apostles. In 1983 the convent moved to a new compound in Toa Payoh and the chapel was subsequently deconsecrated. It is currently part of CHIJMES, a shopping centre.	30 Victoria Street 1.2954026°N 103.8523427°E	1904	26 October 1990
Elgin Bridge	Bridge	The first Elgin Bridge was an iron bridge from Calcutta, which opened in 1862 in place of several previous bridges. (Note: These bridges include a timber bridge during the 1820s, a temporary wooden drawbridge called the Presentment Bridge (also known as the Jackson Bridge), and the Thomson Bridge, which replaced the Presentment Bridge in 1844. The Thomson Bridge was subsequently demolished in 1862 for the first Elgin Bridge.) In 1928 the bridge was reconstructed to facilitate more traffic and to allow tongkangs to pass through, which was done by raising the bridge. Spanning 140 feet (43 m) across the Singapore River, it has three steel bowstring arches and three concrete caissons on each side of the river. Elgin Bridge is named after James B. Elgin, the Governor-General of India from 1862 to 1863.	Singapore River 1.2890256°N 103.8493811°E	1929	15 October 2019
Former Empress Place Building (now Asian Civilisation Museum)	Asian Civilisations Museum	Completed in 1867, various government departments moved from Maxwell's House to the building, where it came to be known as the "Government Offices". It would later come to be known as the "Empress Place Building", which came from the nearby pedestrian space Empress Place and in turned was named after Queen Victoria. It was turned into a history and culture museum in the 1980s. Since 2003, it has been used for the Asian Civilisations Museum. The building features neoclassical details such as rusticated floors, arcaded verandahs, and Roman Doric façades and columns.	1 Empress Place 1.287441°N 103.8513752°E	1864–1920	14 February 1992
Former Admiralty House	School	Completed in 1940 by His Majesty Navy Works Department, it used to house the Commodore Superintendent of Sembawang Naval Base. After several renamings over the years, (Note: The names include Nelson House named after Vice-Admiral Horatio Lord Nelson, Admiralty House in 1958, and ANZUK House in 1971 when the Australian, New Zealand, and United Kingdom (ANZUK) force assumed responsibility for Singapore's defence.) it was finally renamed to the Former Admiralty House when it became a National Monument in 2002. The design of the house, often attributed to Sir Edwin L. Lutyens, has elements of the Arts and Crafts movement. It is planned to be used for the Canberra Library as part of the Bukit Canberra integrated development.	345 Old Nelson Road 1.4475326°N 103.824632°E	1940	2 December 2002
Former Attorney-General's Chambers (now Parliament House Block C)	Parliament House Block C	The first structure recorded on this national monument's site was an annexe of Maxwell's House, which opened in 1839. A second building emerged in the 1880s, either from the annexe demolished or incorporated into a two-storey structure. In 1976, the building was renovated house the chambers of the Attorney-Generals. The building was restored in 1991 where it became part of the Parliament House complex. In order to match the architecture of the neoclassical-styled building with surrounding buildings, a rusticated base was added.	1 Parliament Place 1.28897°N 103.8505178°E	1906	14 February 1992
Former Command House	UBS University	Built c. 1937 to 1938 as the official residence of the General Officer Commanding (GOC) of Malaya, it was originally known as the Flagstaff House. In the 1970s, the British transferred ownership of the house to the Singapore Government after its military withdrew from Singapore. It later became known as the Command House, possibly a reference to being the former residence of the GOC. It is not known who designed the Arts and Crafts movement-inspired building, with some speculating Frank W. Brewer to be the architect. It is currently houses the UBS University.	17 Kheam Hock Road 1.3255622°N 103.8190784°E	1937–1938	11 November 2009
Former Ford Factory (now Memories at Old Ford Factory)	Museum	Starting operations in October 1941, it was built for the Ford Motor Company of Malaya, a subsidiary of Ford Motor Company of Canada. On 15 February 1942, GOC of Malaya Arthur E. Percival meet with General Yamashita at the Ford Plant to discuss the British's surrender of Singapore to the Japanese, where General Percival signed the surrender document in the plant's boardroom. It was subsequently handed back to Fort in 1947 and the manufacture of automobiles resumed until Ford moved out in 1980. Designed by Emile Brizay, it features Art Deco elements such as bevelled doorways and a flagpole rising from the building. The Former Ford Factory was one of Singapore's industrial showpiece at its completion.	315 Upper Bukit Timah Road 1.3528265°N 103.7688399°E	1941	15 February 2006
Former Fullerton Building	The Fullerton Hotel	Opened in 1928 as the Fullerton Building, it was named after the former Fort Fullerton, in turn named after Governor of the Straits Settlements Sir Robert Fullerton. It hosted the various government departments, with a notable one being the General Post Office. After WWII, it continued to house various government agencies. The building underwent renovations between 1997 to 2000 to become The Fullerton Hotel, which opened in 2001. At the time of its opening it had many "modern" facilities, such as having 14 lifts and an automated mail-sorting system.	1 Fullerton Square 1.2862286°N 103.8530281°E	1928	7 December 2015
Former Hill Street Police Station	Occupied by the Ministry of Communications and Information and Ministry of Culture, Community, and Youth	Opened in 1934 as Hill Street Police Station and Barracks, it was built to accommodate the growth of the Singapore Police Force, which later vacated the building in December 1980. From 1983 onwards, it housed various government departments under different names. The neoclassical building was described as "the biggest and grandest of its kind in Malaya" at the time of its opening. A prominent element of this building is its windows, amounting to over 900 and are painted in bright colours.	140 Hill Street 1.2907655°N 103.8482017°E	1934	18 December 1998
Former Kandang Kerbau Hospital	Land Transport Authority	Dr Benjamin Sheares, who later became Singapore's second president, pioneered a surgical procedure at the hospital to create a neovagina for women born without one. NHB credited the hospital's doctors and midwives with lowering maternal and infant mortality rates and driving the post-war baby boom between 1945 and the 1960s. More than 1.2 million babies have been delivered by the time KK Hospital had relocated to the new building in 1997. The building was acquired by LTA thereafter. It housed transport exhibits such as Downtown Line, Thomson-East Coast Line and Jurong Region Line mockup train.	1 Hampshire Road 1.3081622°N 103.8493114°E	1933 - 1955	1 October 2025
Former Raffles College (now NUS Campus at Bukit Timah) (Note: Six of its blocks were collectively gazetted as a national monument, although still counted as one building: Oei Tiong Ham Building, Manasseh Meyer Building, Eu Tong Sen Building, Federal Building, C. J. Koh Law Library, and Li Ka Shing Building.)	National University of Singapore (NUS) Bukit Timah Campus	Open on 22 July 1929, Raffles College was the first college for arts and sciences. In October 1946, it became part of the University of Malaya by merging with the King Edward VII College of Medicine. This increased enrolment to a point where Raffles College can no longer support the student population, resulting in the two schools to split, with the University of Singapore established in the Former Raffles College building. As of date, the Raffles College Building is used as NUS's Bukit Timah Campus. It is designed by Cyril A. Farey and Graham R. Dawbarn.	469E Bukit Timah Road 1.3190357°N 103.8169467°E	c. 1920s	11 November 2009
Former Tanjong Pagar railway station	Planned to be integrated with Cantonment MRT station	Opened on 2 May 1932, it was built in response to the growth of passengers and goods transported by rail with the opening of the Johor–Singapore Causeway. Construction completed in 1931, where it was the southernmost terminal for the Federated Malay States Railways until 30 June 2011. Designed by Swan & Maclaren, the Art Deco building was inspired by existing rail stations in England. The train terminal combines Art Deco and local architecture elements. As of date, it is undergoing works to be integrated with Cantonment MRT station.	30 Keppel Road 1.2727939°N 103.8379301°E	1932	9 April 2011
Fort Siloso (Note: 11 structures within the fort were also collectively gazetted as part of Fort Siloso: 19th century casemates, four gun emplacements, three tunnel complexes, the Battery Command Post, Fire Director Tower, and the former Sergeants’ Mess and Officers’ Mess)	War museum	Built by the British in 1878, Fort Siloso along with other forts were designed to protect the New Harbour (present day Keppel Harbour). During the Battle of Singapore, it was used to fight Japanese soldiers and engaged in several battles. The fort was handed over to the Singapore Armed Forces in 1967 and continued to operate until 1974, when it was turned into a military museum. Designed by Colonial Engineer Henry McCallum, Fort Siloso has an open artillery battery design.	Siloso Road 1.2585159°N 103.808634°E	1878	15 February 2022
Goodwood Park Hotel (Tower Block)	Part of Goodwood Park Hotel	Opened in 1900 as the Deutsches Haus, it was commissioned by the Teutonia Club. The building was acquired by Jewish brothers Morris, Ezekiel, and Ellis Manasseh in 1918, where they eventually turned it into the Goodwood Park Hotel in 1929 and converted its Tower Wing to have guestrooms. It was planned in the 1970s to reconstruct a replica of the tower's original pinnacle, though a new pinnacle resembling the old one was constructed. The tower exhibits elements of the Queen Anne Revival style, though it has been proposed that the tower may have been inspired by castles in the Rhineland, which has tall towers.	22 Scotts Road 1.3088916°N 103.834476°E	1900	23 March 1989
Hong San See	Temple	Built between 1908 to 1913 by Hokkien immigrants from Nan'an, it was a replacement for a previous Hong San See. Several deities are worshipped in the Hokkien architectural-styled temple, mainly Guang Ze Zun Wang.	31 Mohamed Sultan Road 1.2933023°N 103.8409152°E	1908–1913	10 November 1978
House of Tan Yeok Nee	Under restoration	Constructed between 1882 to 1885 by Teochew merchant Tan Yeok Nee, it is modelled after his house in his hometown. After the Tan family moved out, it was occupied by various groups between from 1902 to 1991. As of 2022, it was sold to Indonesian businessman Bachtiar Karim. The house was constructed under feng shui principles and the Teochew architecture style, such as its almost straight roof ridges	207 Clemenceau Avenue 1.2985884°N 103.843386°E	1885	19 November 1974
The Istana	Residence for the President of Singapore	Initiated by Governor of the Straits Settlements Harry Ord, it was originally known as the Government House. In 1959, it was renamed to the Istana Negara Singapura when the British handed the building to Yang di-Pertuan Negara of Singapore Yusof Ishak. The Istana has been the residence for the President of Singapore since 1965. The Istana Negara Singapura features European and Malay elements in its architecture. During certain holidays, the Istana Negara Singapura is open to the public.	Orchard Road 1.307007°N 103.8432241°E	1867–1869	14 February 1992
Istana Kampong Gelam	Occupied by Malay Heritage Centre	Completed in 1843, it was commissioned by then-Sultan of Johor-Lingga-Riau Hussein Shah's son, Tengku Mohammed Ali. The building continued to house Ali's descendants until the 1990s, where it was renovated from 1999 to 2004 to be the Malay Heritage Centre, which opened in 2005. The Istana Kampong Gelam features elements of European and Malay architecture.	85 Sultan Gate	1839–1843	6 August 2015
Jurong Town Hall	Commercial	Constructed between 1971 to 1974, it was built as the JTC's headquarters during the expansion of Jurong Town. As of 2018, Jurong Town Hall is used as a space for start-up companies. The geometric building was designed to symbolise the success of Singapore's industrialisation programme.	9 Jurong Town Hall Road	1971–1974	2 June 2015
Former Keng Teck Whay Building (now Singapore Yu Huang Gong)	Temple	Established in 1831 by Straits Chinese merchants from Malacca, Keng Teck Whay was one of the earliest benefit societies established in Singapore. The building itself features Hokkien architectural elements, such as its curved roof ridge. There are also three structures within the Keng Teck Whay Building: an entrance gateway, an octagonal pagoda, and a hall. Ownership of the building was transferred to a Taoist organisation in 2010, where they renamed it to Singapore Yu Huang Gong and opened it as a temple in 2015.	150 Telok Ayer Street	1847–1875	11 November 2009
Lim Bo Seng Memorial	War memorial	Opened in 1954, it commemorates WWII resistant fighter Lim Bo Seng. Designed by Ng Keng Siang, it is a combination of Chinese and modern architecture, such as its Chinese-style roof on top of a concrete structure.	Connaught Dr	1954	28 December 2010
MacDonald House	Occupied by Citibank	Constructed between 1948 to 1949 as a new branch office for HSBC, it was named after Governor-General of Malaya Malcolm John MacDonald. The building is known to be the site of a bombing in 1965. The Modernist and utilitarian building was one of the tallest buildings in Singapore at the time of its opening and the first air-conditioned office building in Southeast Asia.	40A Orchard Road	1949	10 February 2003
Maghain Aboth Synagogue	Synagogue	Consecrated on 4 April 1878, it was built for the expanding Jewish population in Singapore. The synagogue was only initially for men as Jewish men and women pray separately. A wooden gallery was added for women to pray, which was later turned into a permanent one in 1925. The Jacob Ballas Centre opened next to the Maghain Aboth Synagogue in 2007. The neoclassical-synagogue's interior focuses on the ark.	24 Waterloo Street	1878	27 February 1998
Masjid Abdul Gaffoor	Mosque	Commencing construction in 1907, it was to replace the Al-Abrar Mosque on Telok Ayer Street. It was named after Shaik Abdul Gafoor, who initiated its construction. The mosque features Saracenic elements, such as its cinquefoil arches in its prayer hall, as well as Neoclassical elements, such as Corinthian and Doric pillars. It is largely used by Tamil Muslims.	41 Dunlop Street	1907	5 July 1979
Masjid Al-Abrar	Mosque	Completed in 1855, the Masjid Al-Abrar replaced a small hut with the same name. Between 1986 to 1989, the mosque expanded. Built in the Indo-Islamic architectural style, it features two star and crescent-cladded octagonal minarets next to its entrance. Initially used mainly by those from the Chulia community, the Masjid Al-Abrar still serves Indian muslims, though muslims from other communities have also prayed at the mosque.	192 Telok Ayer Street	1829	19 November 1974
Masjid Alkaff Upper Serangoon	Mosque	Opened in 1932, plans for the mosque were ready by 1927, though the death of a partner for the firm that was meant to design to mosque delayed the project. The Masjid Alkaff Upper Serangoon is built in multiple architectural styles, such as Moorish-styled arches, Corinthian columns, and Neoclassical coffered ceilings.	66 Pheng Geck Avenue	1932	18 December 2014
Masjid Hajjah Fatimah	Mosque	Commissioned in 1845 by Hajjah Fatimah, it was her thanksgiving to Allah for not being harmed when burglars broke into her home. Built in the Indo-Islamic architectural style, it also has some European features. A feature of the mosque is its octagonal minaret tower, which began to tilt after it was completed. Even though repairs were carried out, it still leaned slightly, giving it the moniker the "Leaning Tower of Singapore".	4001 Beach Road	1846	28 June 1973
Masjid Jamae	Mosque		218 South Bridge Road	1830	19 November 1974
Masjid Sultan	Mosque		3 Muscat Street	1928	8 March 1975
Ministry of Labour Building, Old, currently the Subordinate Courts Family and Juvenile Division	Government		3 Havelock Square	1928	27 February 1998
Nagore Durgha	Shrine		140 Telok Ayer Street	1893	19 November 1974
Nanyang University Arch, Nanyang University Memorial and Nanyang University Library and Administration Building, currently the Chinese Heritage Centre	Arch, Memorial, Museum		Yunnan Crescent, 42 Nanyang Avenue and 22 Nanyang Drive	1954–1956	18 December 1998
National Museum of Singapore	Museum		93 Stamford Road	1887	14 February 1992
Parliament House and Annex Building, Old, currently The Arts House at the Old Parliament	Arts		10 Empress Place	1827	14 February 1992, and 3 July 1992
Old Tao Nan School, currently the Peranakan Museum	Museum		39 Armenian Street	1906	27 February 1998
Old Thong Chai Medical Institution	Commercial		50 Eu Tong Sen Street	1892	28 June 1973
Padang	Multi-Purpose Venue		Connaught Dr	c. 1820s	9 August 2022
Prinsep Street Presbyterian Church	Church		77 Prinsep Street	1931	12 January 2002
Raffles Hotel	Hotel		1 Beach Road	1887	4 March 1987, and 3 June 1995
Saint Andrew's Cathedral	Church		11 Saint Andrew's Road	1856–1861	28 June 1973
Saint George's Church	Church		10 Minden Road	1910–1913	10 November 1978
Saint James Power Station	Office		3 Sentosa Gateway	1926	11 November 2009
Saint Joseph's Church	Church		143 Victoria Street	1906–1912	14 January 2005
Saint Joseph's Institution, Former, now the Singapore Art Museum	Museum		71 Bras Basah Road	1867	14 February 1992
Singapore Conference Hall	Multi-Purpose Venue		7 Shenton Way	October 1965	28 December 2010
Siong Lim Temple	Temple		184 Jalan Toa Payoh	1902	14 October 1980
Sri Mariamman Temple	Temple		244 South Bridge Road	1827	28 June 1973
Sri Srinivasa Perumal Temple	Temple		397 Serangoon Road	1855	10 November 1978
Sri Temasek	Government	Initially constructed as the residence for the Colonial Secretary of Singapore, it became the residence for the Prime Minister of Singapore after gaining independence. The building is inspired by European and Indian architecture,	Orchard Road 1.307007°N 103.8432241°E	1867–1869	14 February 1992
Sri Thendayuthapani Temple	Temple		15 Tank Road	1859	20 October 2014
Sun Yat Sen Villa, currently the Sun Yat Sen Nanyang Memorial Hall	Museum		12 Tai Gin Road	1880	28 October 1994
Supreme Court, Old, currently the National Gallery Singapore	Government		1 Saint Andrew's Road	1937–1939	14 February 1992
Tan Kim Seng Fountain	Wartime memorial		Connaught Drive	1882	28 December 2010
Tan Si Chong Su	Temple		15 Magazine Road	1876–1878	19 November 1974
Tan Teck Guan Building	Government		16 College Road	1911	2 December 2002
Telok Ayer Chinese Methodist Church	Church		235 Telok Ayer Street	1924	23 March 1989
Former Telok Ayer Market, currently Lau Pa Sat	Food centre		18 Raffles Quay	1894	28 June 1973
Thian Hock Keng	Temple		158 Telok Ayer Street	1839–1842	28 June 1973
Tou Mu Kung Temple	Temple		779A Upper Serangoon Road	1881	14 January 2005
Victoria Theatre and Concert Hall	Performing Arts Centre		9 Empress Place	1862	14 February 1992
Ying Fo Fui Kun	Clan		98 Telok Ayer Street	1881–1882	18 December 1998
Yueh Hai Ching Temple	Temple		30B Philip Street	1895	28 June 1996
