= SS Hong Chuen =

SS Hong Chuen was a 62-ton wooden coastal steamer owned by the Ho Hong Steamship Company and formerly owned by the Straits Steamship Company. Her last voyage was under charter to the Minister of Economic Warfare for Malaya, complete with Malay crew, in the final days before Singapore fell to the Japanese on 15 February 1942, during World War II.

== Final voyage ==
A party comprising Commander J. Petrie, Lieutenant Colonel Goodfellow, Captain Morgan, Second Lieutenant Hemby, Sergeant Lamb and from the Ministry of Economic Warfare were ordered by Rear Admiral Ernest John Spooner of the Naval H.Q Singapore Base to establish an escape route from Singapore when its fall to the Japanese became inevitable. They planned to go to Sumatra, then overland to Padang, on Sumatra's west coast. The SS Hong Chuen was chartered for this assignment.

The party departed from Singapore on 12 February 1942, and after receiving provisions at the island of Salat Sinki and at Penju on Soregi Bawah Island, the party reached the mouth of the Jambie River at Tigi Solok, at dusk on 13 February 1942.

Their passage had been eventful. The ship was machine gunned from the shore on leaving Singapore waters and there were frequent flights of Japanese bombers overhead. The Malay crew deserted at Penju. The ship picked up sixteen Chinese escapees adrift in a disabled motor tanking off Tjombol Island, and a defective compass caused the party to miss their planned landfall on Sumatra at the mouth of the Indragiri River at Prigi Raja. On the morning of 14 February 1942, the party proceeded up the Jambie River, arriving at Jambie after 24 hours of continuous steaming, at 10:00 on 15 February 1942. The Hong Cheun tied up at Jambie Wharf, where she was set on fire by a blazing oil barge which became wedged alongside her. She sank in one hour. The barge had been set on fire by the Dutch authorities in their "denial of fuel" operations.

== Escape party ==
The escape party, including the sixteen Chinese escapees, proceeded over land by road in two trucks and a car provided by the Dutch authorities and reached Padang, after continuous day and night driving, on 17 February 1942. Some were then dispersed by sea to Columbo, Java, and Australia. Lieutenant Colonel Goodfellow remained in Padang. The escape route established by the party was subsequently used by some hundreds of escapees from Singapore.

== See also ==
- Japanese occupation of Malaya
- Japanese occupation of Singapore
