= Church of Our Lady of Lourdes, Singapore =

Historic site in the Central Region, Singapore

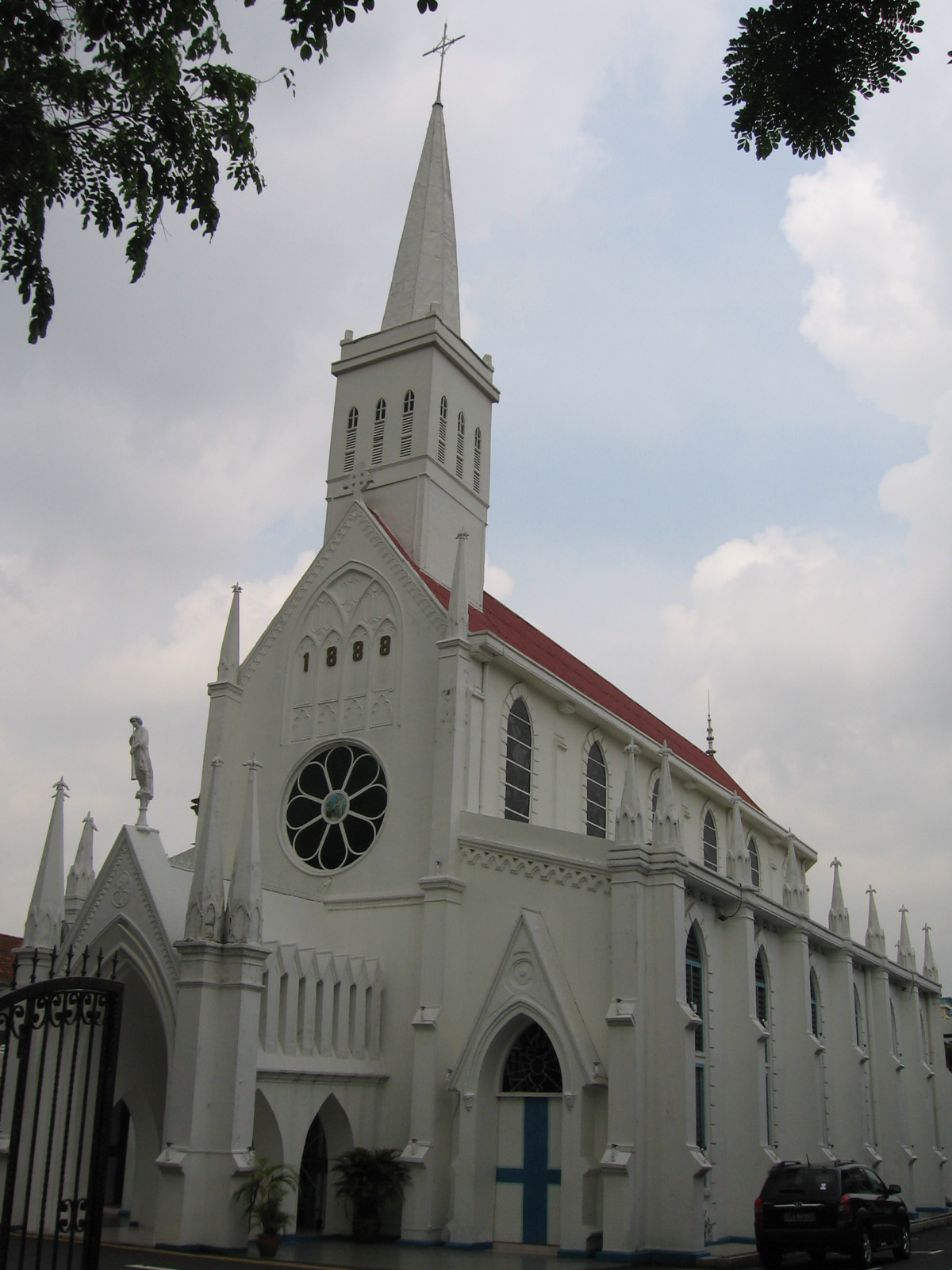
- Church of Our Lady of Lourdes in January 2006

- Location within Singapore
- 1.3032°N 103.8560°E
- Location: 50 Ophir Road, Singapore 188690

History
- Built: 1888; 138 years ago

Site notes
- Governing body: National Heritage Board

National monument of Singapore
- Designated: 14 January 2005; 21 years ago
- Reference no.: 52

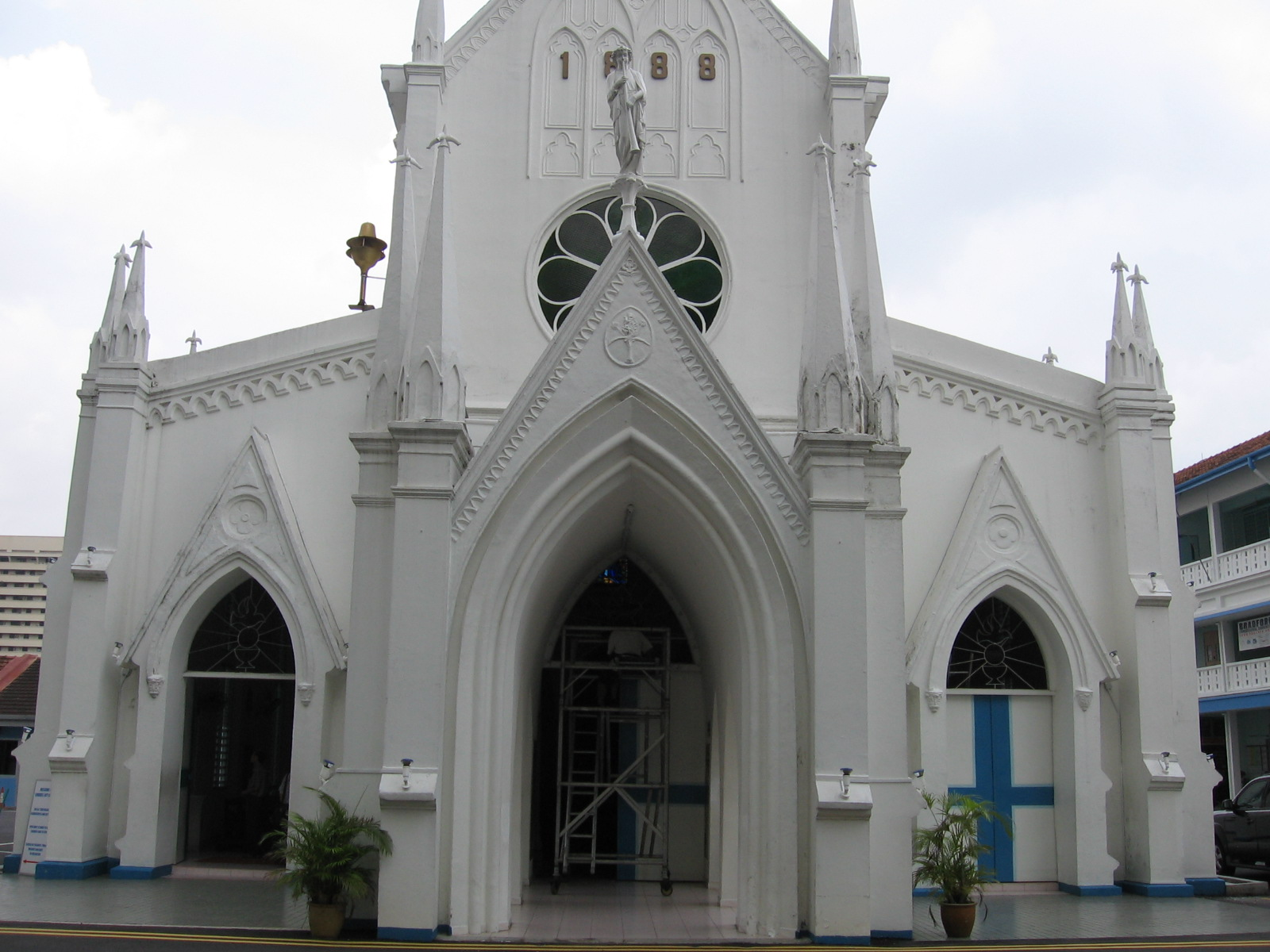
Main entrance to the Church

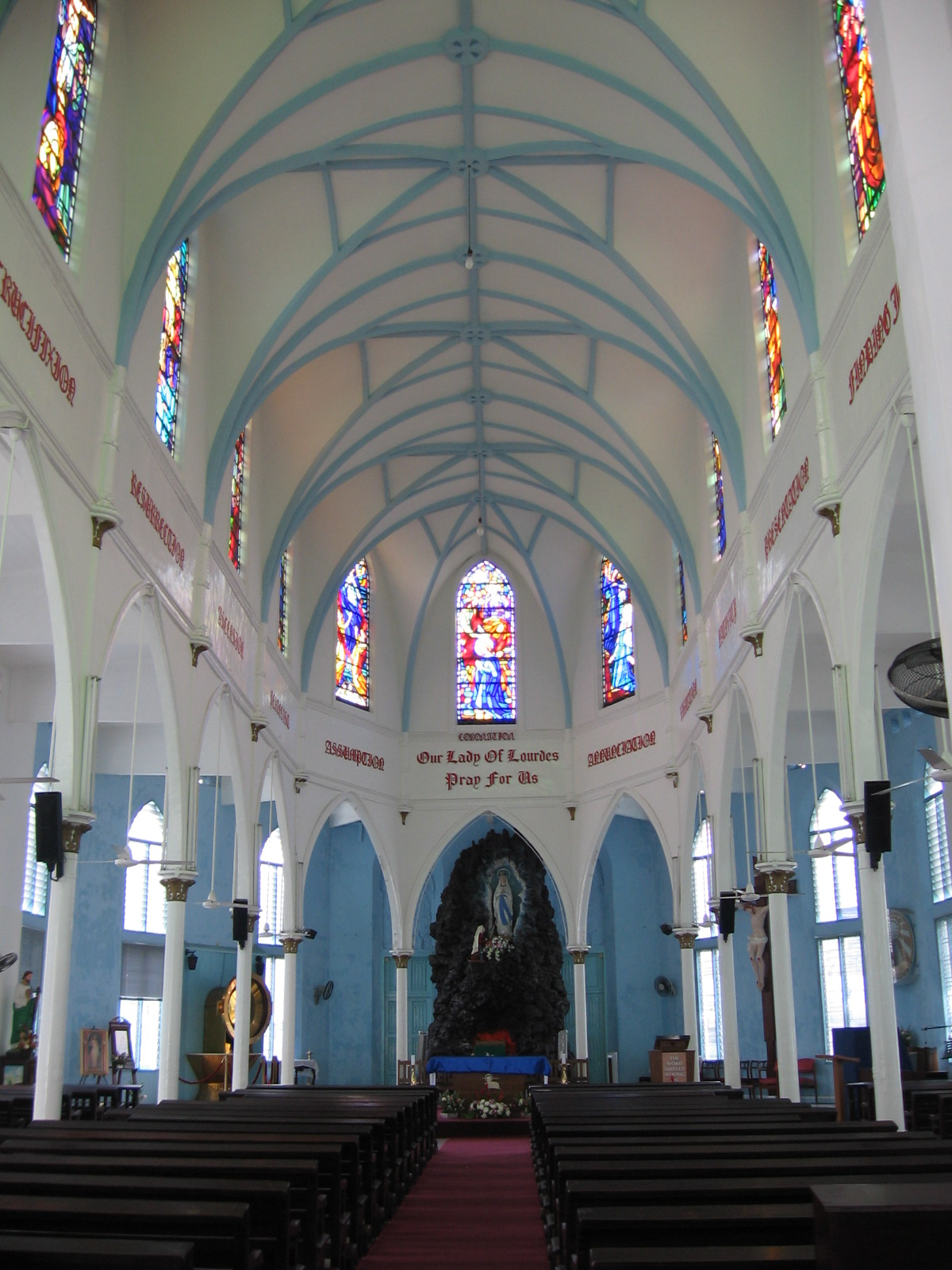
The Church's interior showing the nave, altar and stained glass windows

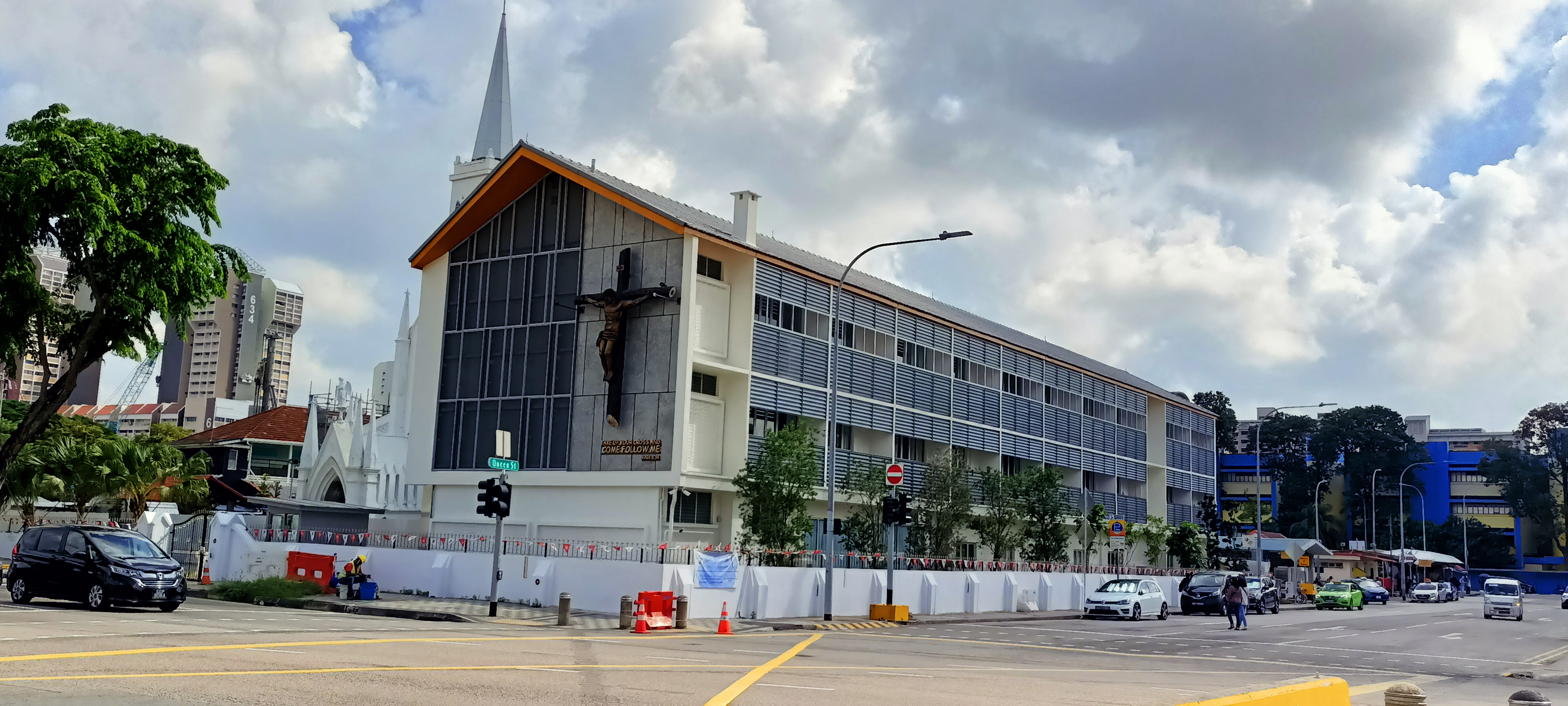
The recent church building, beside the historic building

The Church of Our Lady of Lourdes (Tamil: தூய லூர்து அன்னை ஆலயம்) is a Catholic church in Singapore. It is located at Ophir Road in the Rochor Planning Area, within the Central Area in Singapore's central business district.

== History ==
The Church of Our Lady of Lourdes was blessed and officially opened in 1888. This is the first Tamil Catholic church in Singapore. The building site was obtained in 1885 and the cornerstone laid on 1 August 1886 by Bishop Gasnier, D.D. and Sir Frederick A. Weld, G. C M. G in an official ceremony that was witnessed by a number of religious and laity. It bears a resemblance to the Sanctuary of Our Lady of Lourdes, in France. Within the Church building itself is a grotto with life-sized statues depicting the appearance of Our Lady appearing to Saint Bernadette.

Masses are held in English, Tamil and Sinhalese.

The Church of Our Lady of Lourdes was gazetted as a national monument on 14 January 2005. As a national monument, it was given funding from the National Monuments Fund, administrated by the National Heritage Board, in 2016 for renovation works.

== Architecture ==
In 2009, the church building underwent restoration works to resemble the original church at a budget of S$1.75 million. It was completed in October 2010.
