= Tan Si Chong Su =

Century old Chinese temple in Singapore

- 陳氏宗祠
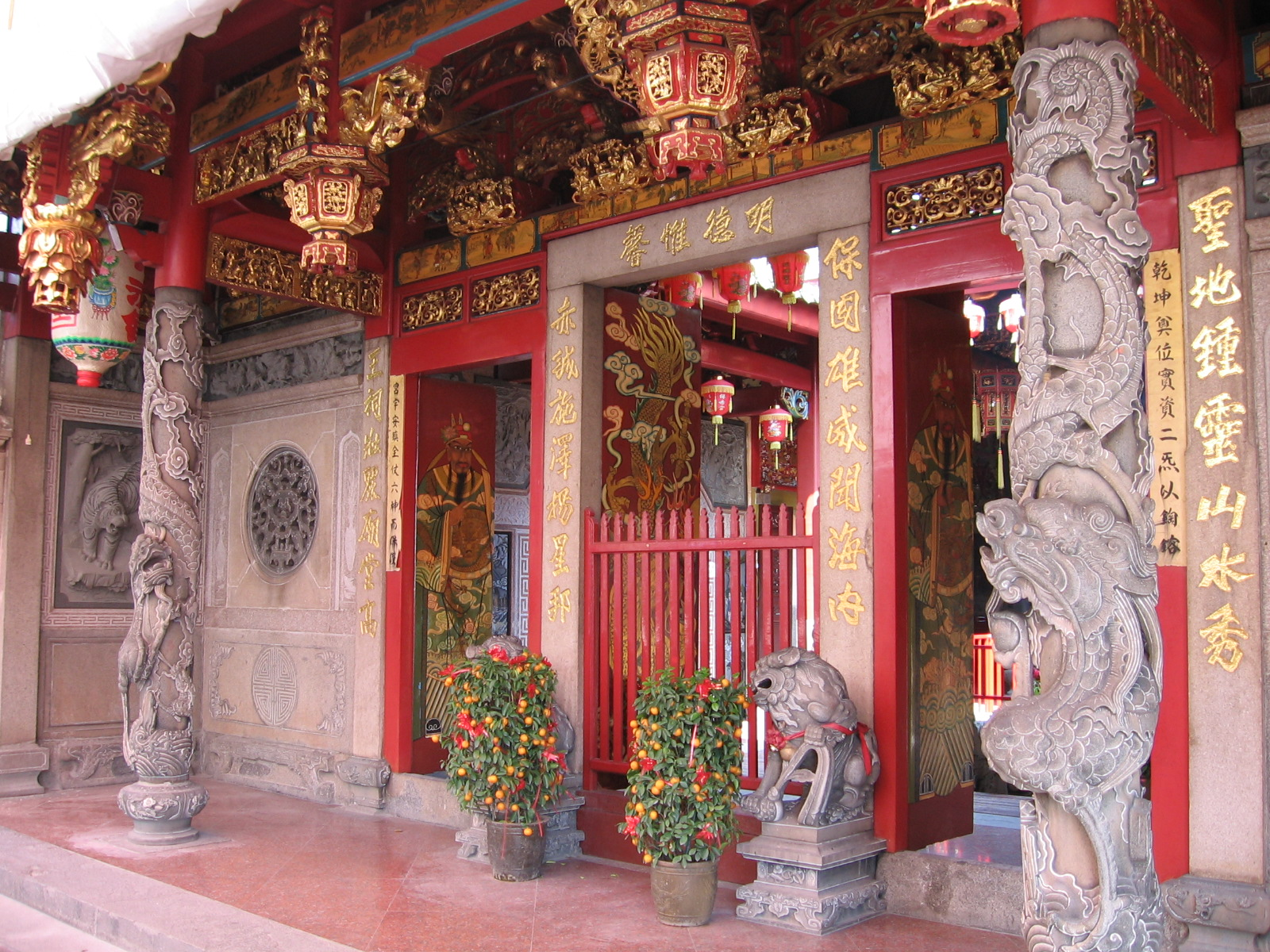
- Tan Si Chong Su Temple

- Location within Singapore

Architecture
- Heritage designation: National Monument of Singapore
- Designated date: 19 November 1974
- Completed date: 1878; 148 years ago

Site
- Location: 15 Magazine Road
- Coordinates: 1°17′21.7″N 103°50′33.6″E
- Public access: Yes

National monument of Singapore
- Designated: 19 November 1974; 51 years ago
- Reference no.: 12

Tan Si Chong Su, or Ancestral Hall of the Tan Clan, is a Chinese temple in Singapore. It is located on Magazine Road in the Singapore River Planning Area within Singapore's central business district. It was constructed between 1876 and 1878 as the ancestral temple for those with the same Tan surname, based on the premise that Chinese people with the same surname would share a common ancestry and therefore belong to the same clan. The Temple also dedicated to Kai Zhang Sheng Wang, the Patron Deity and founder of Zhangzhou City in China.

The temple is also known as the "Tan Seng Haw" and Po Chiak Keng (保赤宮, also written as Bao Chi Gong and other variants), meaning "palace for the protection of the innocent", reflecting its earlier role as a place that provided help for those in disputes as well as new Chinese immigrants in Singapore.

== History ==
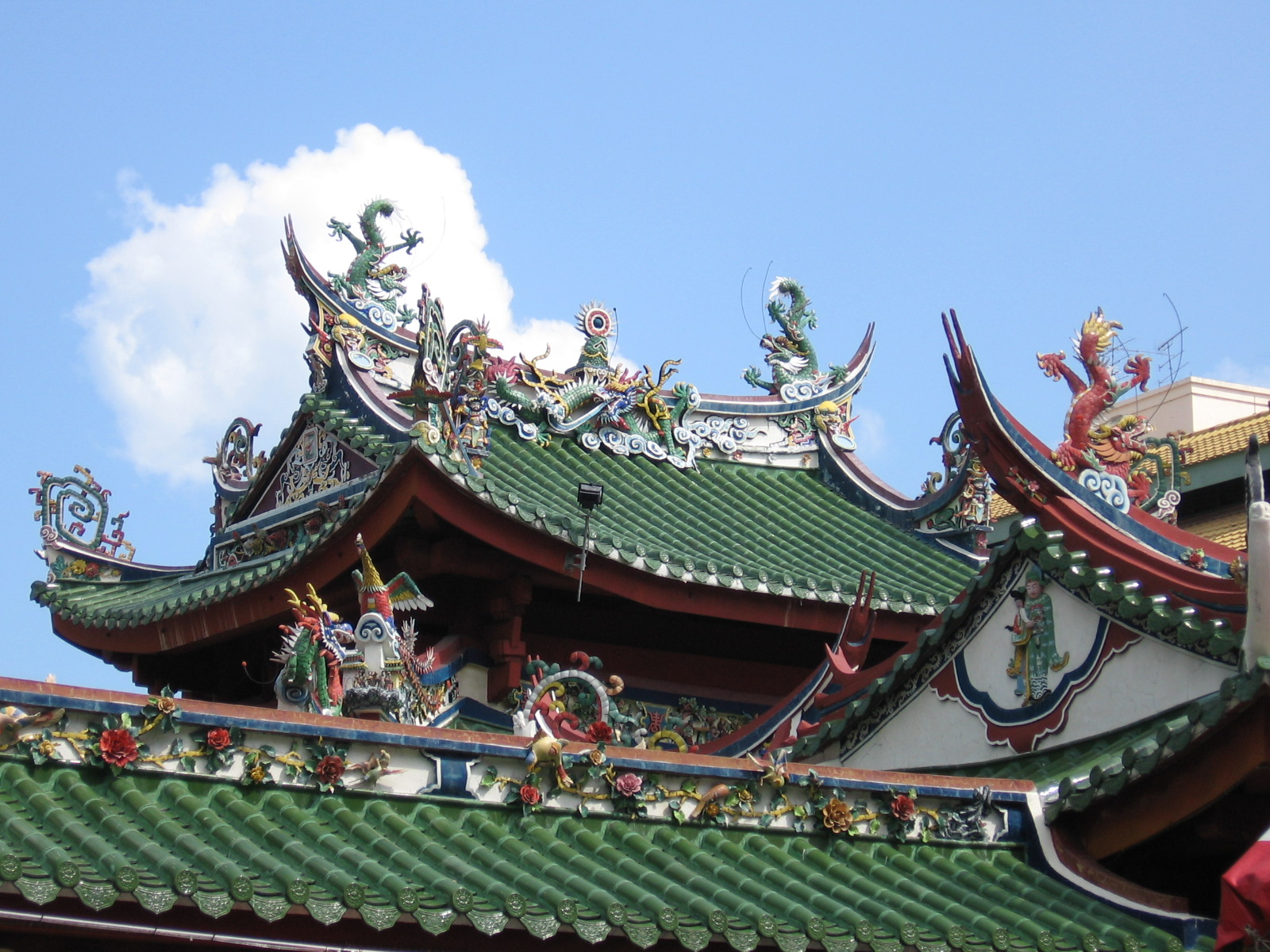
The curved roof ridges are decorated with ornate ceramic phoenixes, flowers and dragons.

The first president of the temple was Tan Kim Tian. An indenture dated 28 July 1880 gave the names of the temple trustees as Tan Cheng Kiat, Tan Chew Cha, Tan Siak Kiew, Tan Mah Arang, Tan Hai Tiew and Tan Sim Boh.

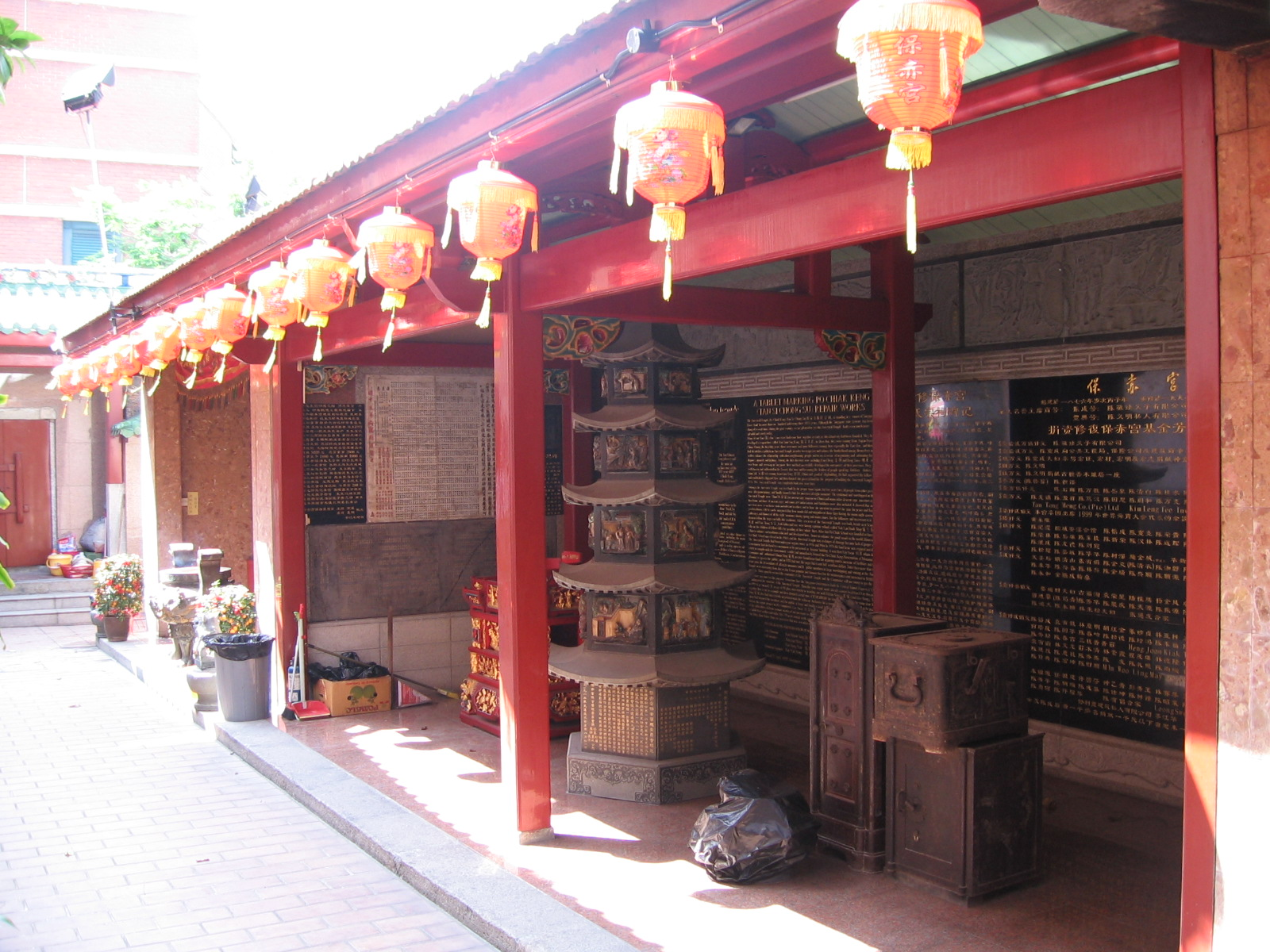
One of the wings of the temple originally housed a boys' school, Po Chiak School, founded in 1889, but was closed in 1949

It was gazetted as a national monument on 19 November 1974.

== Function ==
The temple was built as the ancestral temple of Tan clan. The Chinese believed that people with the same surname share a common ancestry. An ancestral temple like Tan Si Chong Su provides their clan members a place to honour and respect their ancestors. It is here where the spirit tablets of deceased clan members are enshrined and venerated. The complex consists of an entrance hall, a main hall where the Deities are enshrined, and a rear hall where the ancestral tablets of illustrious Tans are kept. The halls are separated by open courtyards.

The temple also served as the assembly hall for the Tan clan whose members extended beyond Singapore to Malaysia. Among some famous Tans associated with the temple was the former Finance Minister of Malaysia, Tun Tan Siew Sin, and his father, Tun Dato' Sir Tan Cheng Lock, founder and first president of the Malaysian Chinese Association, an important political party in Malaysia. Tan Cheng Lock and Tan Siew Sin were from Malacca as were the fathers of the temple's original founders. The temple's founders, Tan Kim Ching and Tan Beng Swee, were also associated with Malacca Peranakan clans. Another famous Tan is Tan Chin Tuan, a retired banker and noted philanthropist and one of the temple's trustees.

== Architecture ==
The temple tackles issues of geomancy, axiality and orientation in relationship with its surrounding buildings, roads and circulation. For example, geomancy was said that a Chinese temple is not favorable to be allocated at the end of a narrow and tight street due to bad luck and to avoid holy mess.

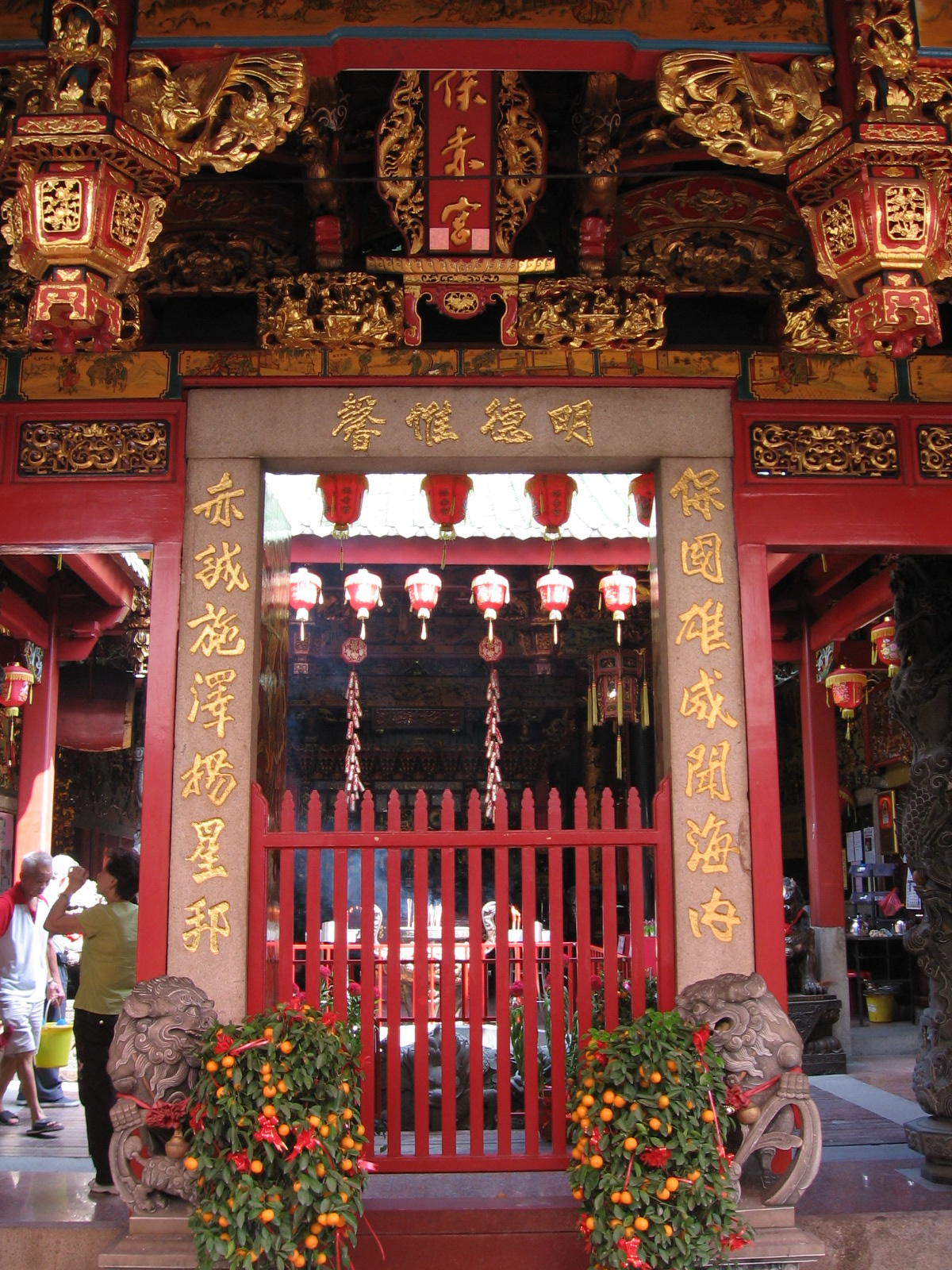
Two lions, male and female, in granite guard the entrance.

== News articles ==
- "Po Chiak Keng: Only Tans could pray here before 1982". The Straits Times (online). 16 February 2017.
