= Tan Beng Wan =

Singapore businessman (b. 1851, d. 1891)

- 陈明远
- Born: 1851; Vietnam
- Died: 25 December 1891 (aged 39–40); Singapore
- Occupation: Businessman

Tan Beng Wan (Chinese: 陈明远; 1851 – 25 December 1891) was the co-founder of Tan Kim Tian and Son Steamship Company and a member of the Municipal Commission of Singapore.

== Early life and education ==
Tan was born in Vietnam 1851 and was later adopted by Tan Kim Tian. He attended Raffles Institution in Singapore.

== Career ==
He and his father founded the Tan Kim Tian and Son Steamship Company in 1865. The business propsered following their decision to concentrate on steamships instead of sail. They purchased ships secondhand or directly ordered them from shipbuilders in the United Kingdom. Following his father's death in 1882, he tok over sole charge of the business. He was elected a municipal commissioner for Central Ward in December 1888 and was reelected in December 1889. However, due to his deteriorating health, he resigned from the council in the beginning of December 1891, after which A. L. Donaldson was elected in his place. He also served as the president of the Straits Insurance Company.

== Personal life and death ==
He was married to Lim Imm Neo. Together, they had two sons, Tan Cheng Siang and Tan Cheng Yan. Cheng Siang would eventually take over the family business from Tan. He was a close friend of Tan Jiak Kim.

He died on 25 December 1891.
