= Chinese Protectorate =

The Chinese Protectorate was an administrative body responsible for the well-being of ethnic Chinese residents of the Straits Settlements during that territory's British colonial period. Protectorates were established in each area of the Settlements, namely Singapore, Penang and Malacca. Each was headed by a Protector. The institution was established in 1877 to handle all matters related to the Straits Settlements' Chinese residents. In particular, it sought to mitigate the human rights violations of the coolie trade, which had expanded to notorious levels by the 1850s in the region.

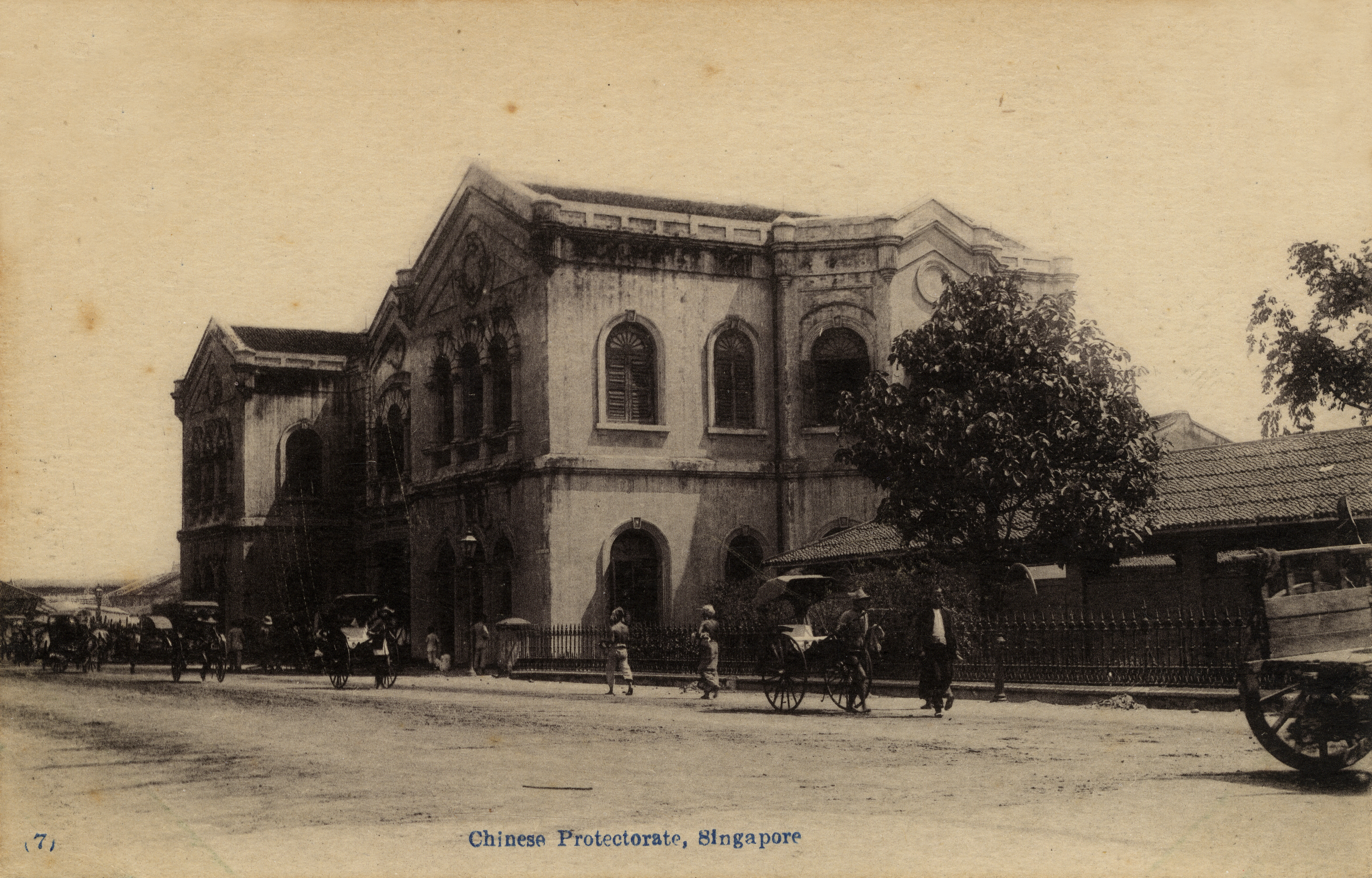
Chinese Protectorate building, located at the corner of Havelock Road and New Bridge Road, in the early 20th century

== The coolie trade ==
Perhaps the most significant goal of the British colonial administration in the founding of the entity was to regulate and humanize the coolie trade and lessen the misery of the coolies, who were subject to merciless exploitation. First, coolie agents were required to register with Protectorate. Policing by the Chinese Protectorate freed up the labour market and firms (mainly British-run) seeking to hire Chinese workers, who no longer had to go through coolie brokers and secret societies. As a result of this improvement in conditions, the number of Chinese arrivals increased dramatically from the 1880s onwards.

== Goals of the Protectorate ==
Likewise, agents of the Chinese Protectorate often visited domestic servants. Those found to be subjected to especially inhumane conditions were sent to Singapore's Home for Girls. The Protectorate sought to have all Chinese social societies (including the kongsi) - many of which were secret societies or bodies of organized crime - register with the government. The institution also encouraged the Chinese to seek the government’s help instead of going to the secret societies, thus weakening the latter's influence among the Chinese. The protectorate also aimed to protect women and young girls, who were tricked into prostitution in brothels that were manned by secret societies, and remove all girls there under the age of 16 for immoral practices.

== See also ==
- Old Ministry of Labour Building, site of the Chinese Protectorate in Singapore from 1930 until the outbreak of World War II
