= Old Ministry of Labour Building =

Court building in Outram, Singapore

Coordinates: 1°17′13.3″N 103°50′37.5″E

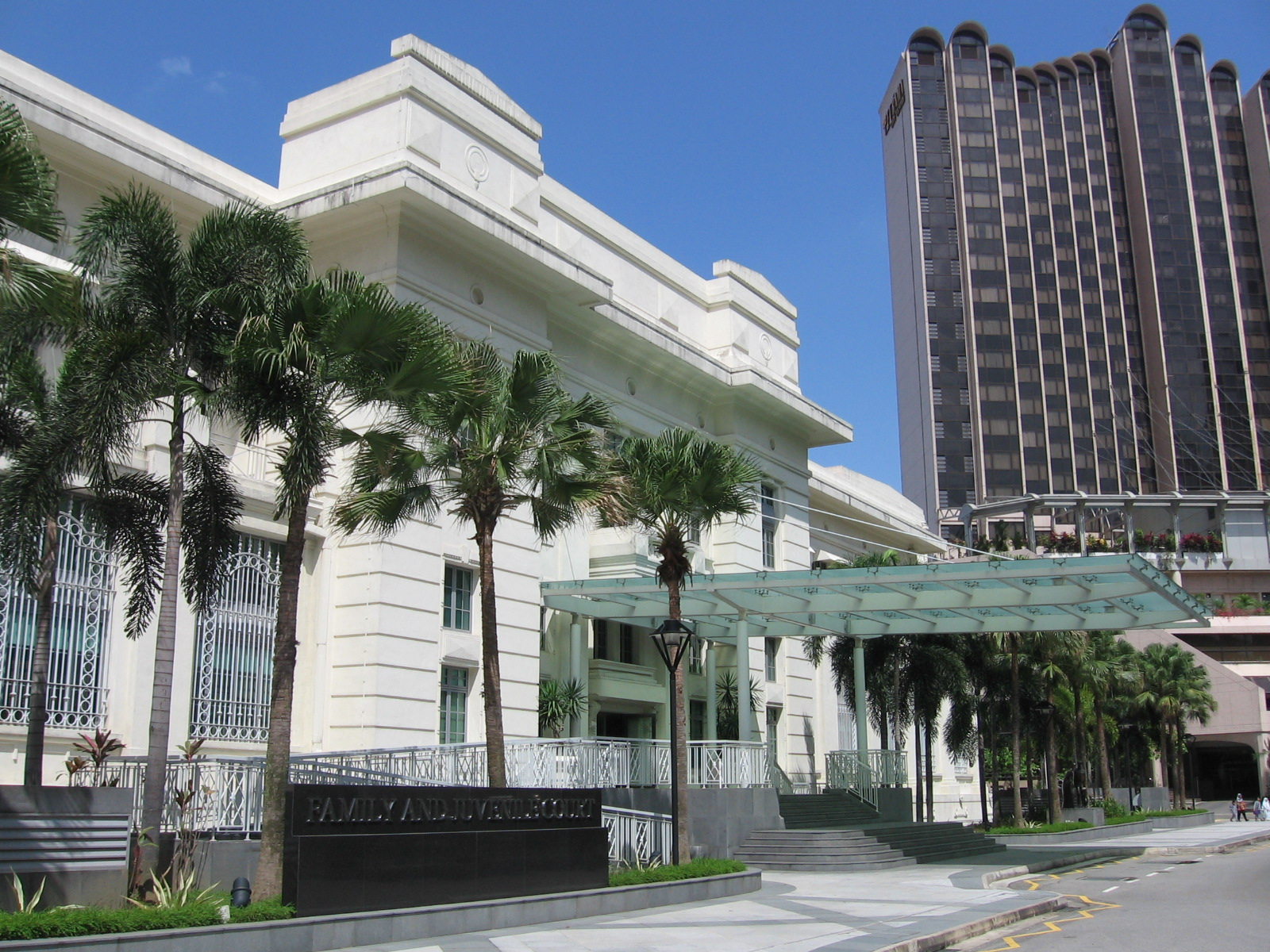
- The Old Ministry of Labour Building currently houses the Family and Juvenile Court of Singapore

- Location within Singapore
- Former names: Chinese Protectorate Building; Ministry of Labour Building
- Alternative names: Family and Juvenile Court Building

General information
- Status: Open
- Architectural style: Neo-Classical
- Location: Singapore, 3 Havelock Square, Singapore 059725, Singapore
- Named for: Ministry of Labour
- Construction started: 1928
- Completed: 1930
- Opened: 1930
- Renovated: 1990

Technical details
- Floor count: 2

National monument of Singapore
- Designated: 27 February 1998; 28 years ago
- Reference no.: 36

The Old Ministry of Labour Building (Chinese: 前劳工部大厦; Malay: Bangunan Lama Menteri Pekerja) is a former building of the Ministry of Labour located at Havelock Square in the Outram Planning Area, within the Central Area of the central business district in Singapore. The building once housed the former Chinese Protectorate which was first established in 1877 to protect and control Chinese immigrants to Singapore. The building had since been restored in 1990 and currently used as the Family and Juvenile Court of Singapore.

== History ==
In 1877, the Chinese Protectorate was launched as an intermediary between the colonial government and the Chinese community to try to stem the abuse of Chinese immigrants. The role of Chinese Protectorate was to look after the welfare of the Chinese community, its work involved fighting the exploitation of prostitutes and coolies by their agents, the regulation of Chinese societies, and the control of triads. The first Chinese Protectorate was in a shophouse on Canal Road.

As the protectorate's responsibilities and staff strength grew, its office was first relocated to the Upper Macao Street (present day Pickering Street), followed by a new shophouse at Boat Quay, and finally to a newly constructed two storey building at the corner of New Bridge Road and Havelock Road in 1886.

The former Chinese Protectorate Building was later demolished and new Neo-Classical building was built in 1928 on its former site, with the Chinese Protectorate moved in 1930. The Chinese Protectorate functioned at the building until the outbreak of World War II. After the war, its responsibilities were taken over by the Ministry of Labour and Social Welfare from 1956 and later, the Ministry of Labour and renamed as Ministry of Labour Building. The former Ministry of Labour Building was later taken over by the Ministry of Law and had been refurbished as the Family and Juvenile Court Building in 1990.

== National Monument ==
The Old Ministry of Labour Building was gazetted as a national monument on 27 February 1998.
