= Bowyer Block =

Historic building in Singapore

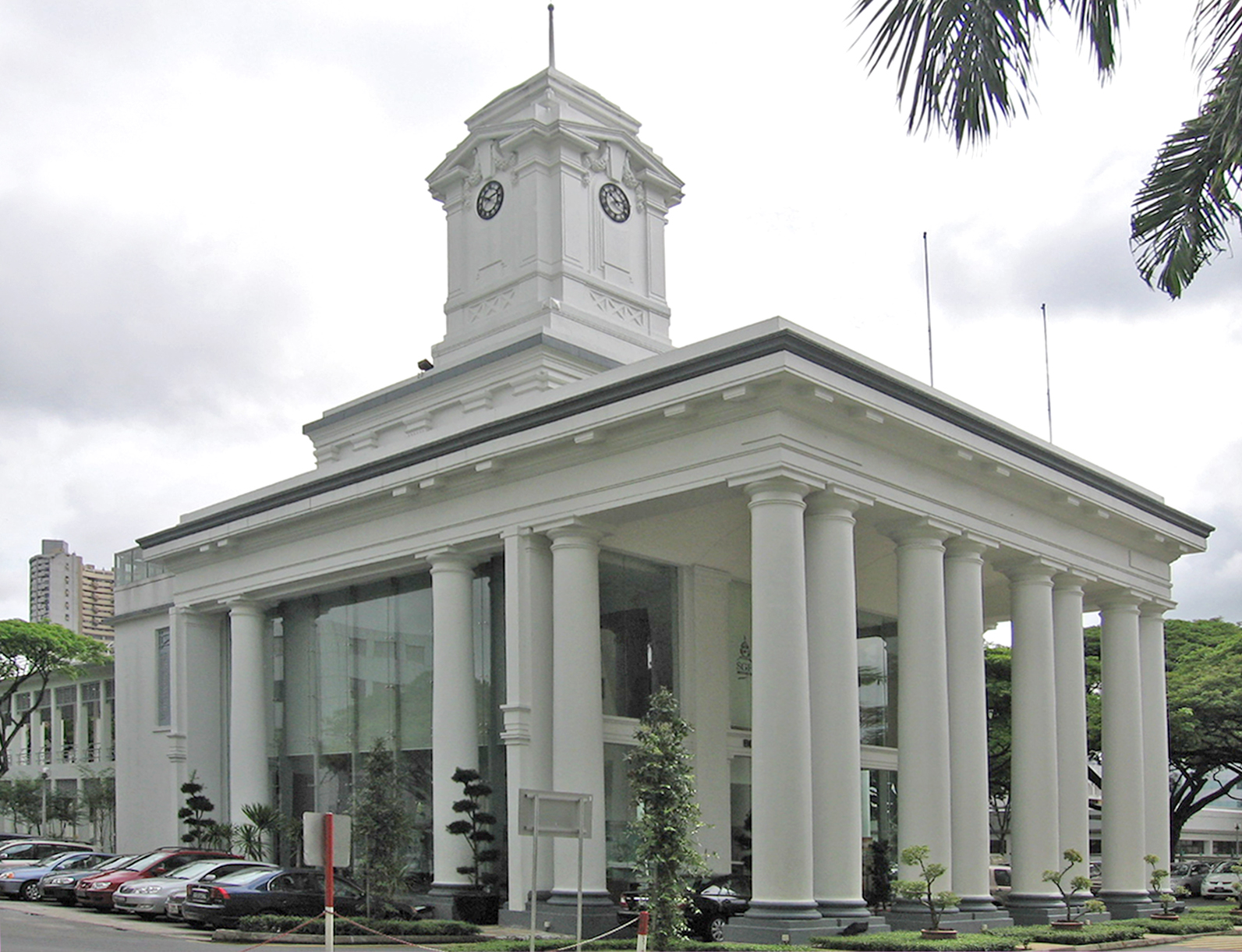
- The building in 2019

- Location within Singapore
- Interactive map of Bowyer Block
- 1.2807°N 103.8340°E

History
- Built: 1926

Site notes
- Architect: Percy Hubert Keys
- Governing body: National Heritage Board

National monument of Singapore
- Designated: 11 November 2009; 16 years ago
- Reference no.: 61

Bowyer Block, formerly known as the Upper Block, is a historic building which previously served as the main administration building of the Singapore General Hospital. It currently houses the Singapore General Hospital Museum.

== Description ==
The façade of the portico is lined with Colossal Tuscan columns. Only the central portion of the block that contained the portico and clock tower are retaiend, with the side wings both demolished, one of the wings being demolished in the early 1980s. The building features a clock tower with clock faces on all sides, each flanked by Doric pilasters and topped by a triangular pediment.

== History ==
The building was constructed in 1926, along with the Middle Block and the Lower Block of the Singapore General Hospital. It was designed by government architect Percy Hubert Keys. Following the World War II, the building was renamed to Bowyer Block, after John Herbert Bowyer, the Chief Medical Officer of the hospital who had been tortured to death by the Japanese during the Japanese occupation of Singapore. The building served as the main administration building of the hospital, and housed the staff quarters, the first and second class male wards, some first class female wards, the School of Nursing, the Department of Renal Medicine, an X-ray department and several other departments and clinics.

In June 1981, most of the building's facilities were moved to either the Lower Block, which by then had been renamed the Norris Block, or the new Singapore General Hospital, which was officially opened in September. The Singapore General Hospital Museum was established in the hospital in 2005.

The building was gazetted as a National Monument on 11 November 2009.
