= Tan Kim Tian =

Shipping magnate in Singapore

Tan Kim Tian (1832 — 1882) was the co-founder of the Tan Kim Tian and Son Steamship Company and the first president of the Tan Si Chong Su, a Chinese temple in Singapore.

== Early life and education ==
Tan was born in Malacca in 1832. He travelled to Singapore in 1847.

== Career ==
Tan became an employee of Paterson Simons Merchants shortly after arriving in Singapore. Merchant William Paterson, who was a partner of the firm, arranged for him to attend English school, allowing him to become fluent in English. He later became a shopkeeper in the firm's Produce Department.

After retiring from Paterson Simons Merchants, he founded the Tan Kim Tian and Son Steamship Company with his son, Tan Beng Wan in 1865. The business prospered following their decision to concentrate on steamships instead of sail. He was the first president of Tan Si Chong Su. He also owned the Kim Tian's Pier on Havelock Road along the Singapore River.

== Personal life and death ==
Tan was married to Wee Poh Kiok. They adopted Tan Beng Wan, and several children after adopting him. He lived in the Botan House, which he built, on Neil Road.

Tan died in 1882. Kim Tian Road and Kim Tian Place were named after him.
