= Conway Pulford =

Royal Air Force air marshal

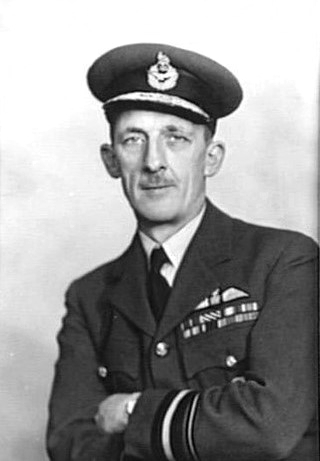
- Born: 26 January 1892; Agra, India
- Died: 10 March 1942 (aged 50); Chibia, Dutch East Indies
- Burial place: Kranji War Cemetery, Singapore
- Spouse: Elinore Mildred Pulford
- Military career
- Allegiance: United Kingdom
- Branch: Royal Navy (1905–18); Royal Air Force (1918–42)
- Service years: 1905–1942
- Rank: Air Vice Marshal
- Commands: RAF Far East (1941–42); No. 26 (Training) Group (1937–38); RAF Heliopolis (1932–34); RAF Bircham Newton (1931–32); No. 7 Squadron (1929–31); No. 210 Squadron (1920)
- Conflicts: First World War; Second World War
- Awards: Companion of the Order of the Bath; Officer of the Order of the British Empire; Air Force Cross; Mentioned in Despatches; Croix de guerre (France)

Air Vice Marshal Conway Walter Heath Pulford, CB, OBE, AFC (26 January 1892 – 10 March 1942) was a senior Royal Air Force officer during World War II. Pulford commanded British forces in the Japanese invasion of Malaya and the subsequent fall of Singapore.

Pulford died of exhaustion and malaria after his evacuation vessel was attacked by Japanese aircraft and ran aground on an uninhabited island.

== Early life ==
Pulford was born in Agra, India the son of Russell Richard and Lucy Anne Pulford.

== Naval career ==
Pulford began his career in the Royal Navy in 1905 as a Naval Cadet at the Royal Naval College, Osborne. After serving as a midshipman on HMS Russell and HMS Lion, and as a sub-lieutenant on HMS Larne, he became a pilot on the aircraft carrier HMS Ark Royal in December 1914.

== RAF career ==
In January 1920, Pulford left the Navy for the Royal Air Force, becoming a squadron commander in 1921. Pulford attended the RAF Staff College in 1922 and the Imperial Defence College in 1929.

=== Second World War ===
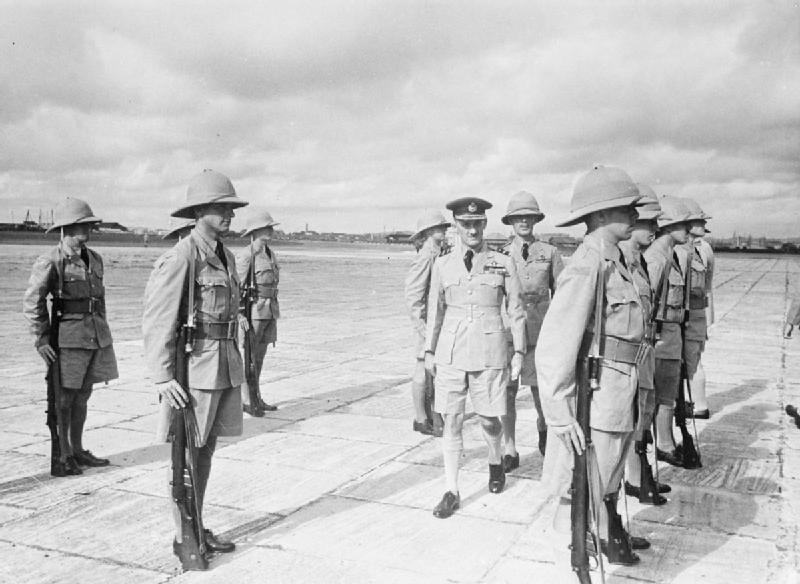
Air Vice Marshal Pulford inspects trainees of the Malayan Volunteer Air Force at Sembawang, Singapore

In 1941 he attempted to build up the RAF in the Far East to support all the forces under the Far East Command. But before the Japanese attacked on 8 December 1941, the Far East was given a low priority, so little was done. To bolster his very small staff now that the war had started, Air Vice Marshal Paul Maltby arrived and undertook duties as his deputy. Pulford was authorised to evacuate himself on 5 February 1942. Ten days later Pulford and his naval counterpart, Rear Admiral Ernest Spooner, were amongst the last to leave. Their vessel, the Royal Navy ML 310, was attacked by Japanese aircraft and forced to run aground on a malaria-ridden island called Chibia (Tjibia, Tjebia), part of the Juju group located north of Bangka Island, Indonesia, and was uninhabited. The survivors managed to hold out for two months before being forced to surrender to the Japanese, but the Air Vice Marshal and Rear Admiral had both died of exhaustion and malaria. When Pulford did not arrive in Java, Maltby took over command of RAF Far East Command, but was captured and spent the rest of the war as a prisoner of war of the Japanese.
