= Ernest John Spooner =

Royal Navy Rear-Admiral (1887-1942)

Rear-Admiral Ernest John Spooner DSO
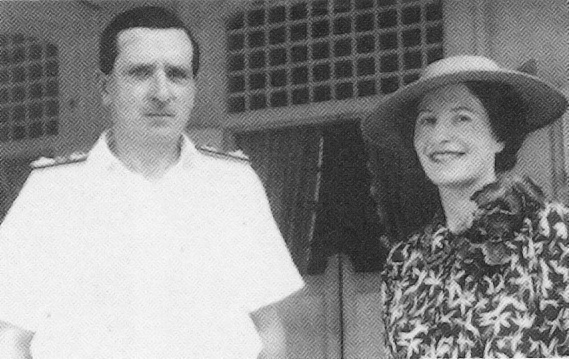
- Ernest Spooner with his wife Megan at the Admiralty House in Singapore, 1941
- Born: 22 August 1887; Winchester, England
- Died: 15 April 1942 (aged 54); Chibia, Dutch East Indies
- Burial place: Kranji War Cemetery, Singapore
- Military career
- Allegiance: United Kingdom
- Branch: Royal Navy
- Service years: 1903–1942
- Rank: Rear-Admiral
- Commands: HMS Fortitude (1940–41); HMS Repulse (1938–40); HMS Vindictive (1937–38); HMS Frobisher (1936–37); HMS Dragon (1930–32)
- Conflicts: First World War; Second World War
- Awards: Distinguished Service Order

Rear-Admiral Ernest John Spooner, DSO (22 August 1887 – 15 April 1942) was one of the senior Royal Navy officers at Singapore during the World War II Japanese invasion of Malaya and the subsequent fall of Singapore.

Spooner died of exhaustion and malaria after his evacuation vessel was attacked by Japanese aircraft and ran aground on an uninhabited island.

== Early career ==
Educated at West Downs School in Winchester, Spooner joined the Royal Navy and served in the First World War. He became Deputy Director at the Operations Division of the Admiralty in 1932, commanding officer of the Navigation School at Portsmouth in 1934 and commanding officer of the cruiser HMS Vindictive in 1937 before becoming commanding officer of the battlecruiser HMS Repulse in 1938. He was appointed as flag officer commanding the Northern Patrol from July 1940 to September 1940.

== Malaya Campaign ==
Spooner served in the Second World War and was ordered to Singapore to take up the post of Rear Admiral, Malaya in 1941. When the Japanese launched their invasion of Malaya on 8 December 1941, Spooner initially had two immediate superiors: Admiral Sir Tom Phillips (Commander-in-Chief, Eastern Fleet) and Vice-Admiral Geoffrey Layton (Senior Naval Officer, Malaya). However, Admiral Phillips was killed when his flagship HMS Prince of Wales was sunk along with HMS Repulse on 10 December by Japanese bombers. Then on 5 January 1942, Vice-Admiral Layton, who had replaced Phillips, moved his headquarters to the island of Java to streamline the organization of supply convoys to the Dutch East Indies and Malaya. This left Spooner as the senior naval officer in Singapore.

By the end of January, the Royal Navy had almost no real fighting strength left in Malaya, and the decision was taken to abandon Singapore in favour of Java. Most naval personnel were evacuated aboard the merchantman Empire Star on 12 February, but Spooner and a few others remained behind to assist in organizing the evacuation of civilians from the island, which was now just days away from surrender. Spooner's wife was one of those who was evacuated.

The evacuations were a dismal affair due to circumstances beyond Spooner's control. The situation had become so dire that anything more than rudimentary coordination was impossible. Furthermore, Japanese naval and air forces operating in the seas around Malaya destroyed many of the ships that left Singapore in the final days before the surrender on 15 February. One of the vessels caught up in the attempted escapes was the ML 310 transporting Spooner, Air Vice Marshal Conway Pulford and some 40 others. The vessel was attacked by Japanese aircraft and its passengers became stranded on a small island called Chibia (Tjibia, Tjebia). Chibia was part of the Juju group located north of Bangka Island, and was uninhabited. Even worse, there was almost no fresh water. Despite British search efforts, the stranded refugees remained on the island for two months before disease and starvation forced the survivors to surrender to the Japanese. By that time, both Spooner and Pulford had died of exhaustion and malaria.

== Family ==
In 1926 Spooner married the noted soprano Megan Foster.
