= Birthday of the Monkey God =

Singaporean cultural and religious holiday

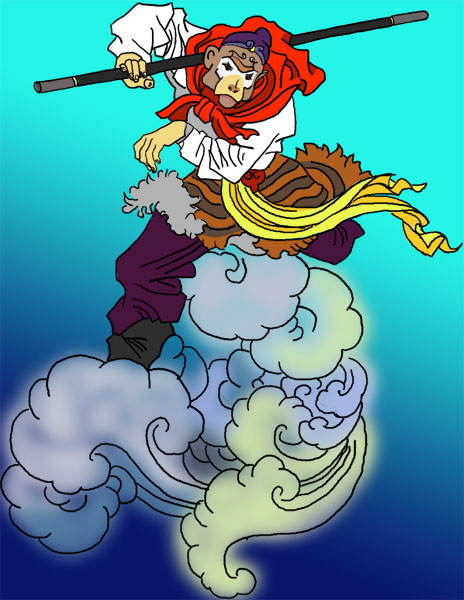
The Monkey God Sun Wukong

The Birthday of the Monkey God is a cultural and religious holiday celebrated in Singapore on the 15th or 16th day of the First Lunar Month. The dates on the Western Calendar vary from year to year. It marks the birthday of Sun Wukong, the protagonist in the classical novel Journey to the West. The popular celebratory customs associated with the Birthday of the Monkey God have both secular and religious (Taoist) themes. This is not to be confused with the Monkey King Festival celebrated in China on the 16th day of the Eighth Lunar Calendar.

== Monkey God ==
Sun Wukong, also known as the Monkey God and Qi Tian Da Sheng (齊天大聖) meaning ‘Great Sage, Equal of Heaven’, is a protagonist in Journey to the West, a Chinese classical novel. According to Singapore's first temple devoted to the Monkey God, "Monkey god is almighty, resourceful, mercurial, brave and vigorous, who can identify true and false, helping poor and needy, is deeply respected and loved by many generation of people [sic]". He is now greatly revered in Singapore and many temples are built in his honour.

Most temples in Taiwan or Singapore only worship Qi Tian Da Sheng and few know about the origins of other Chinese monkey gods that were worshipped prior to Journey to the West.

== History and celebration ==
People in Singapore have been worshipping the Monkey God since as early as 1920, when the Tiong Bahru Monkey God Temple, which is allegedly the first Monkey God temple, was established. The Birthday of the Monkey God is celebrated annually on the 15th or 16th day of the First Lunar Month. While it is observed mostly by Singaporeans, people of other nationalities, such as Indonesians, Malaysians, and Thais, are known to celebrate it too. Celebration often involves mediums referred to as Tan Kees performing "miraculous feats", which includes piercing their own flesh and blood-penning. In the full regalia, the medium begins swaying his head, twitching his fingers, and jerking his legs, all the while seated on his blood red ‘Dragon Chair’. During the occasion there are also non-violent activities, including vocal performances on the street and lion dances. The Birthday of the Monkey God is generally deemed as Taoist in nature.
