= Snow City =

Singapore's first indoor snow centre

Coordinates: 1°20′06.6″N 103°44′06.7″E

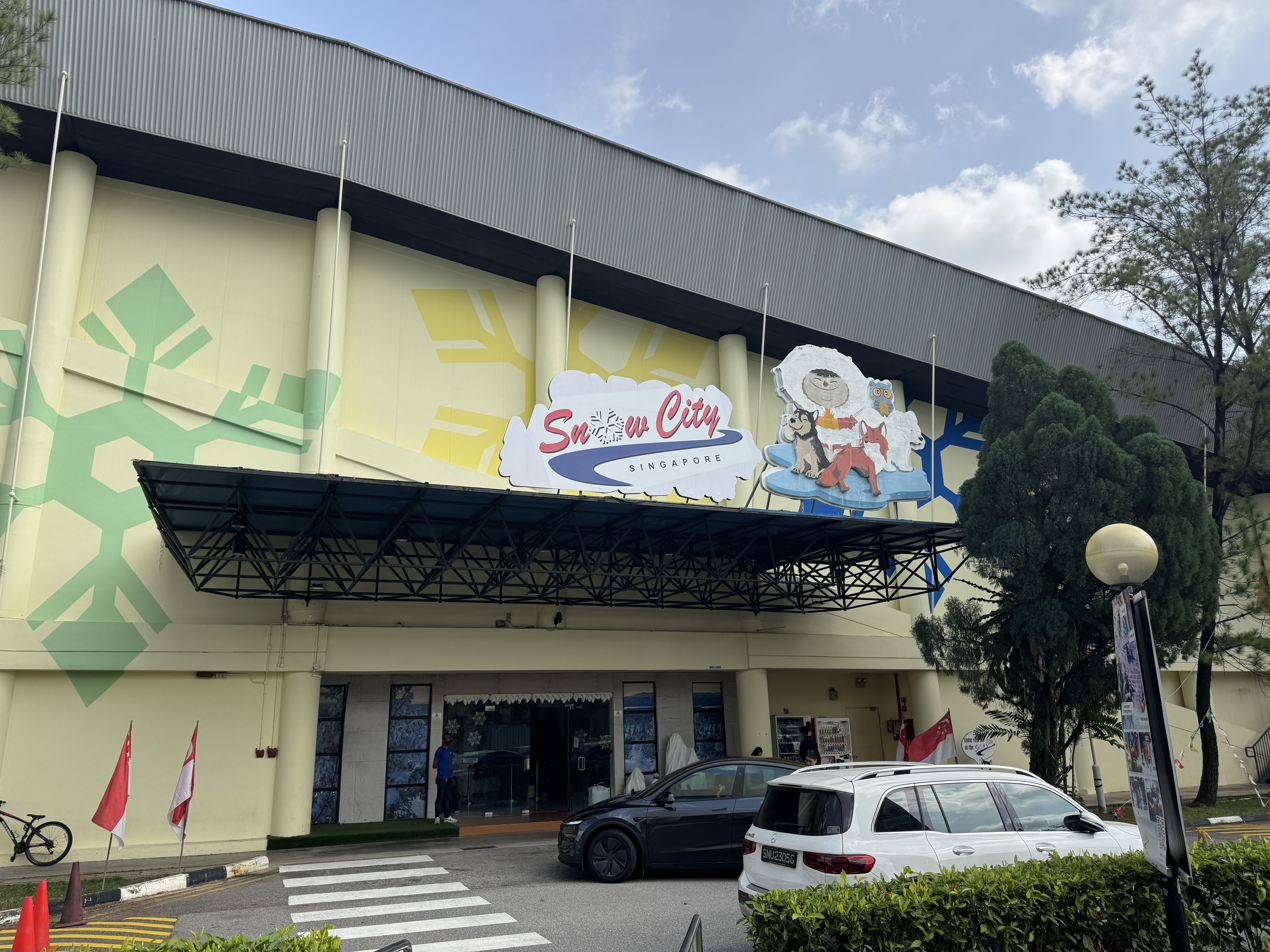
- Snow City in 2026

- Location within Singapore

General information
- Status: Closed
- Location: Jurong East, Singapore, 21 Jurong Town Hall Road, Singapore 609433, Singapore
- Opened: 3 June 2000; 26 years ago
- Renovated: 2007; 19 years ago 2015; 11 years ago
- Closed: 30 September 2026; 34 days ago
- Cost: S$6 million
- Affiliation: Science Centre Singapore

Technical details
- Floor count: 2
- Floor area: 3,000 square metres (32,000 sq ft)

Website
- www.snowcity.com.sg

Snow City was Singapore's first indoor snow center located within the Science Centre Singapore area, beside the Omni-Theatre in Jurong East.

== History ==
The 3,000 square-meter center Snow City was built at the cost of S$6 million and was officially opened on the 3rd June 2000. It was created through a joint venture by the Science Centre Singapore and NTUC Income Co-operative Pte Ltd. This collaboration was intended to provide the residents of the tropical country of Singapore with a first-hand experience of the cold climates and snow, which they might not otherwise get.

On 19 May 2026, Science Centre announced that Snow City would be shutting down on 30 September that year.

== Highlights ==
Visitors first arrived at the airlock, which is maintained at 10°C. This allowed visitors to acclimate to the lower temperatures before they entered the chamber itself.

The major focus of Snow City was its "snow chamber", a 1200 sq-metre room covered with snow. The snow chamber was maintained at -5°C, and the snow level was kept constantly at 40 cm in depth. Between 10 and 15 tons of snow was created each week in order to maintain this level. The snow was produced using a special "snow gun", which cooled the water using liquid nitrogen.

Inside the snow chamber was a 60-meter-high slope which was about 3 storeys high. "Snowtubing" was the main activity, where visitors slid down the snow slope while sitting on an inflatable tube.

There is also a snow play area for younger children.

Snow City's educational programmes and workshops were available to schools and other groups.

On 30 September 2026, Snow City permanently closed after 26 years of operations in Singapore.
