= List of tourist attractions in Singapore =

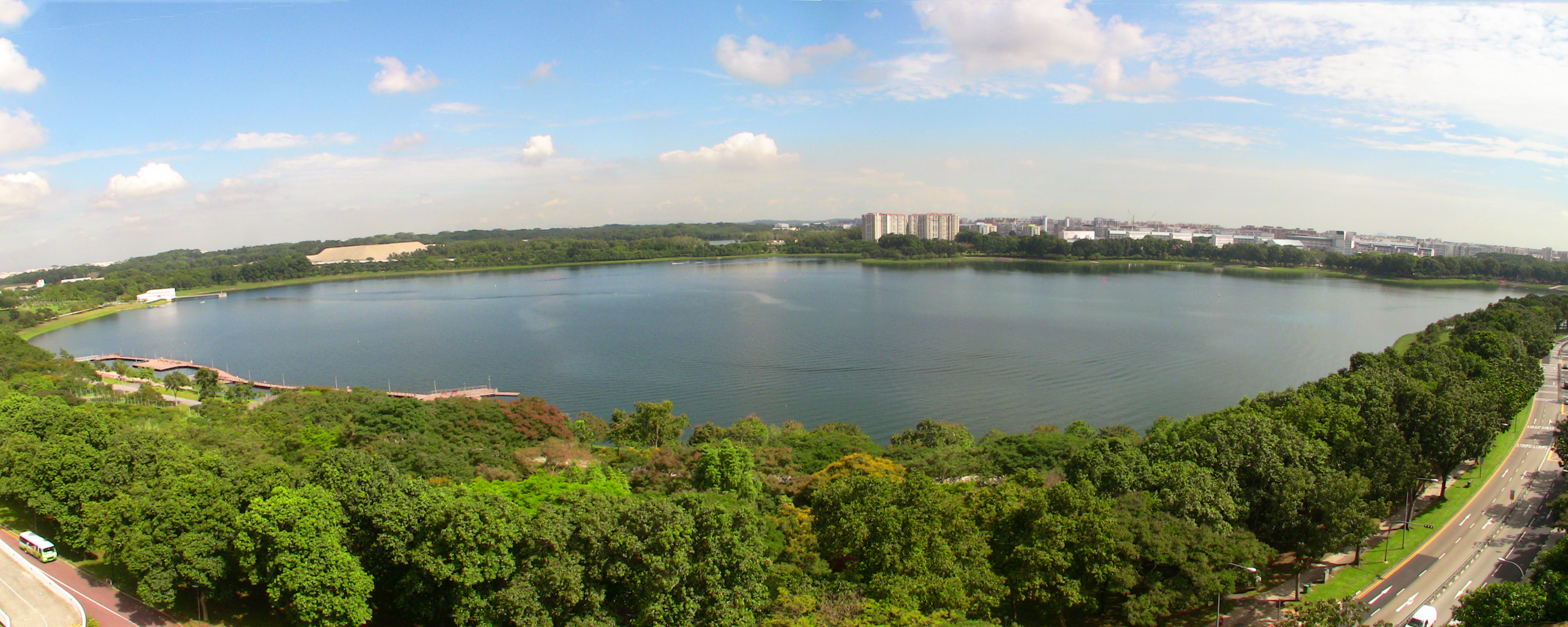
Bedok Reservoir

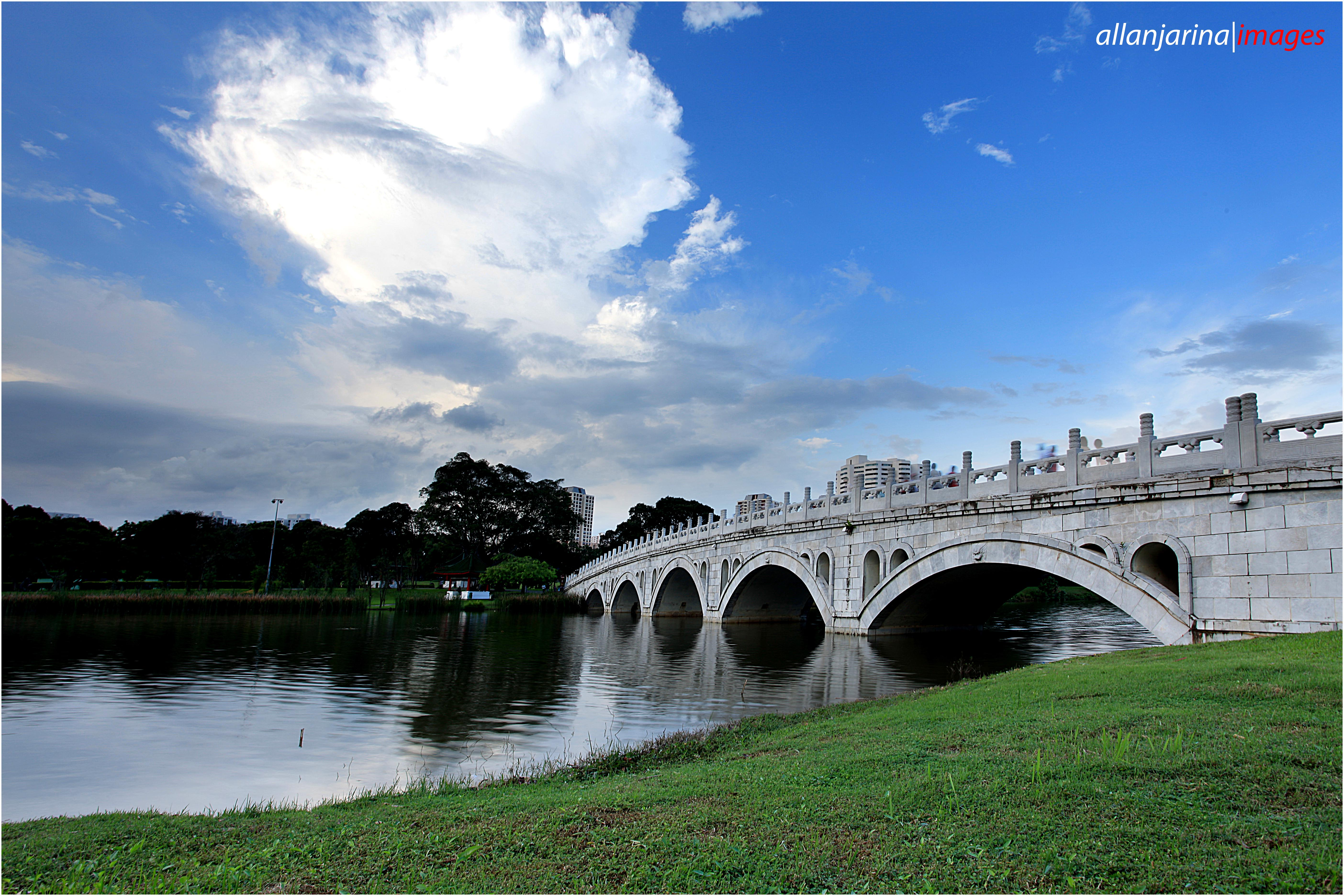
Chinese Garden

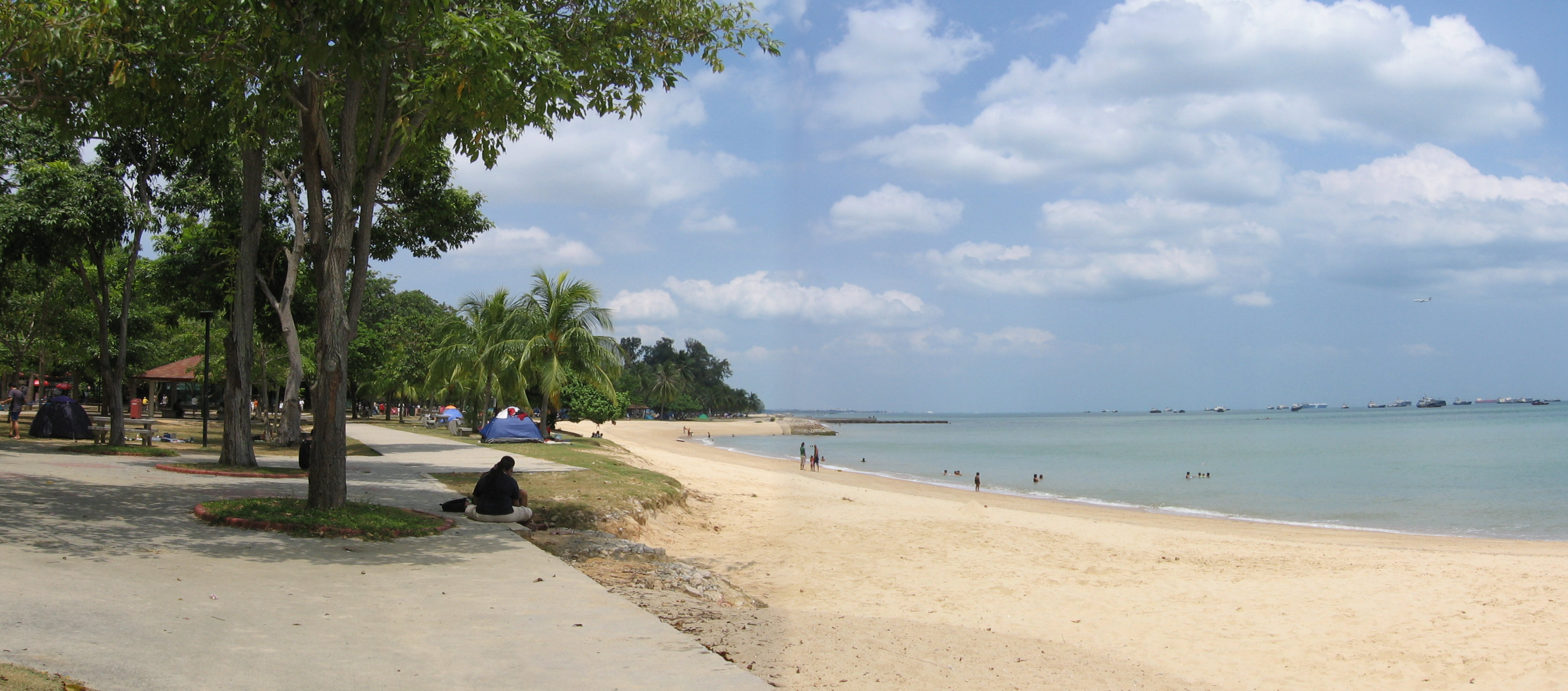
East Coast Park

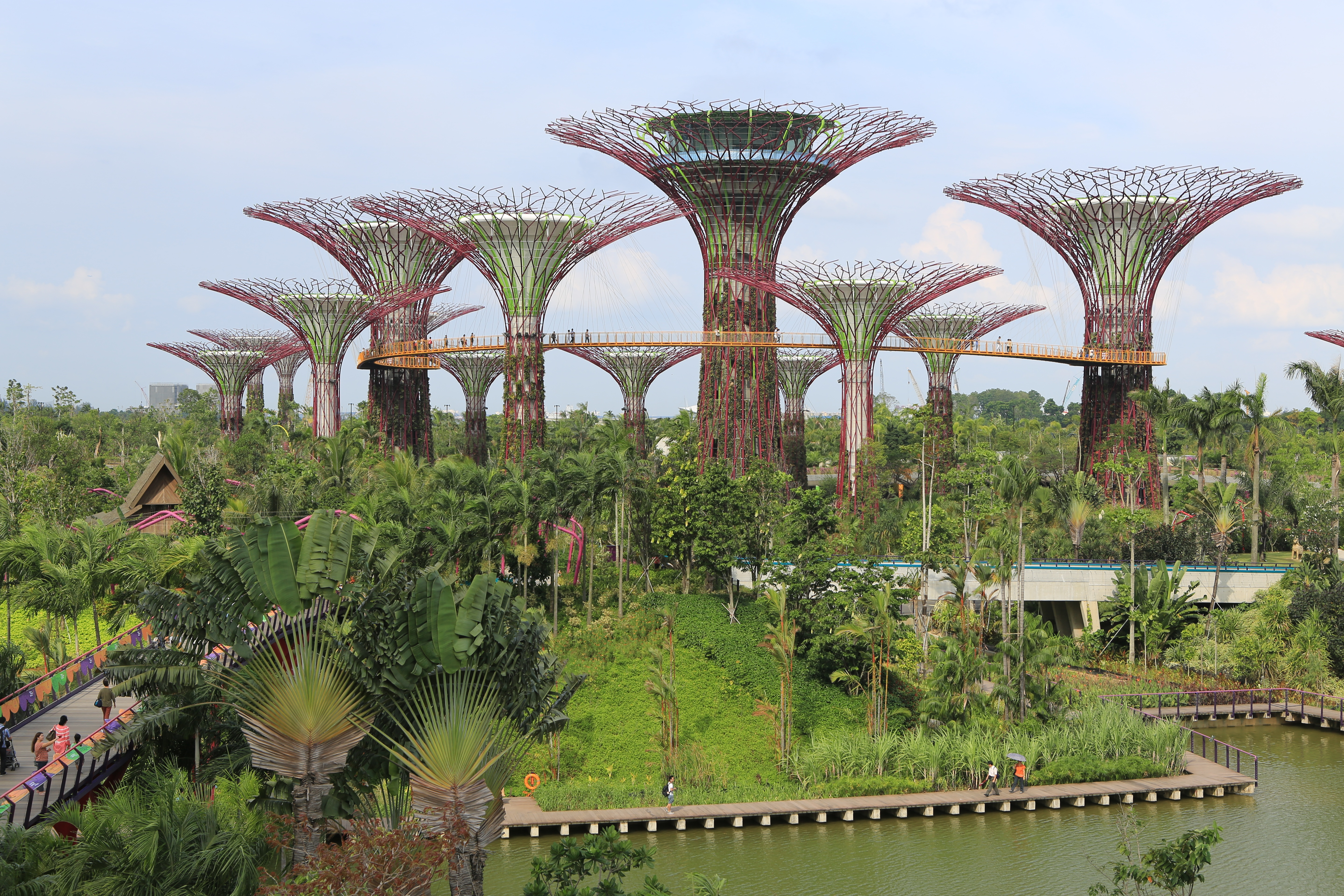
Gardens by the Bay

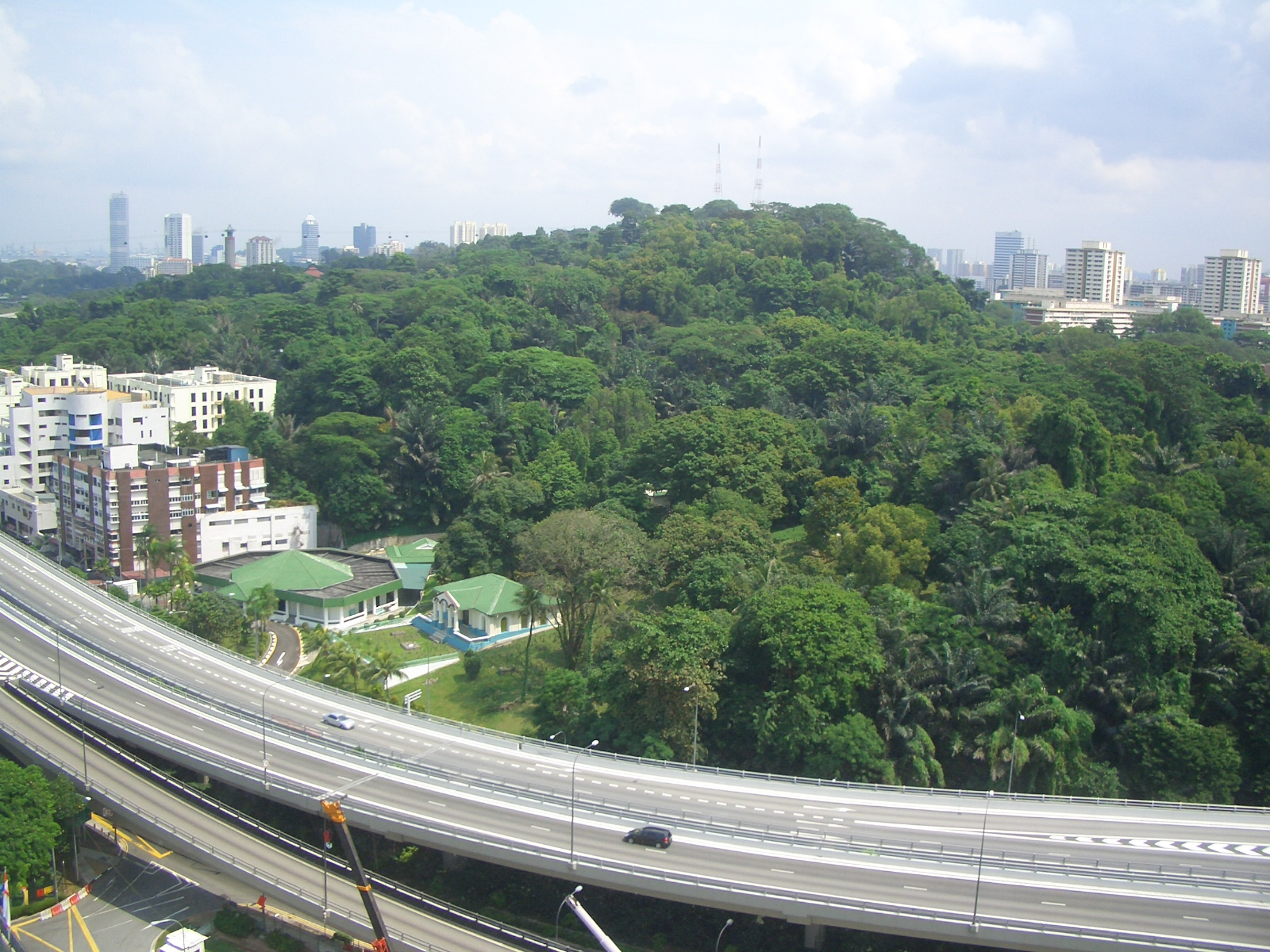
Mount Faber

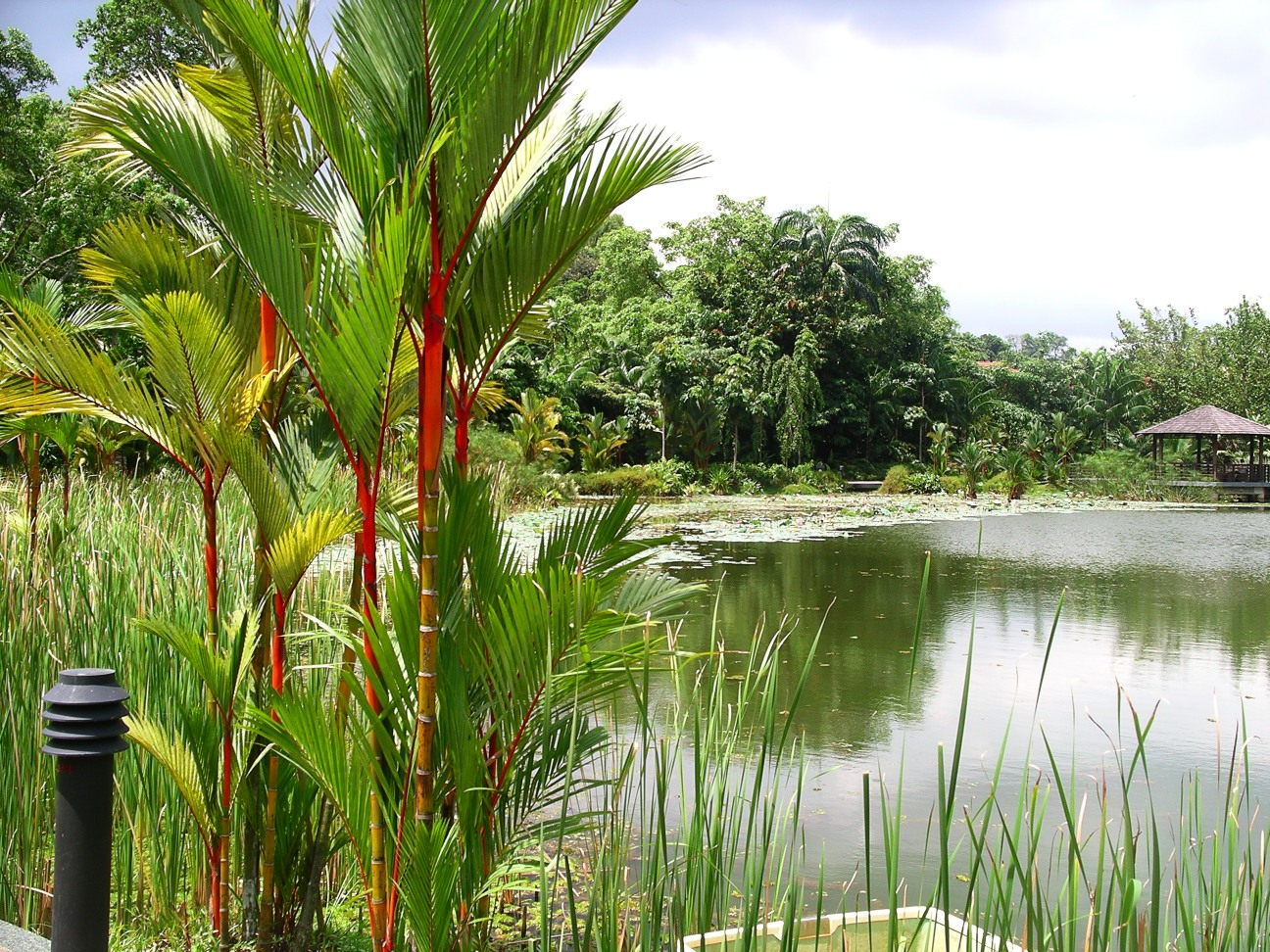
Singapore Botanic Gardens

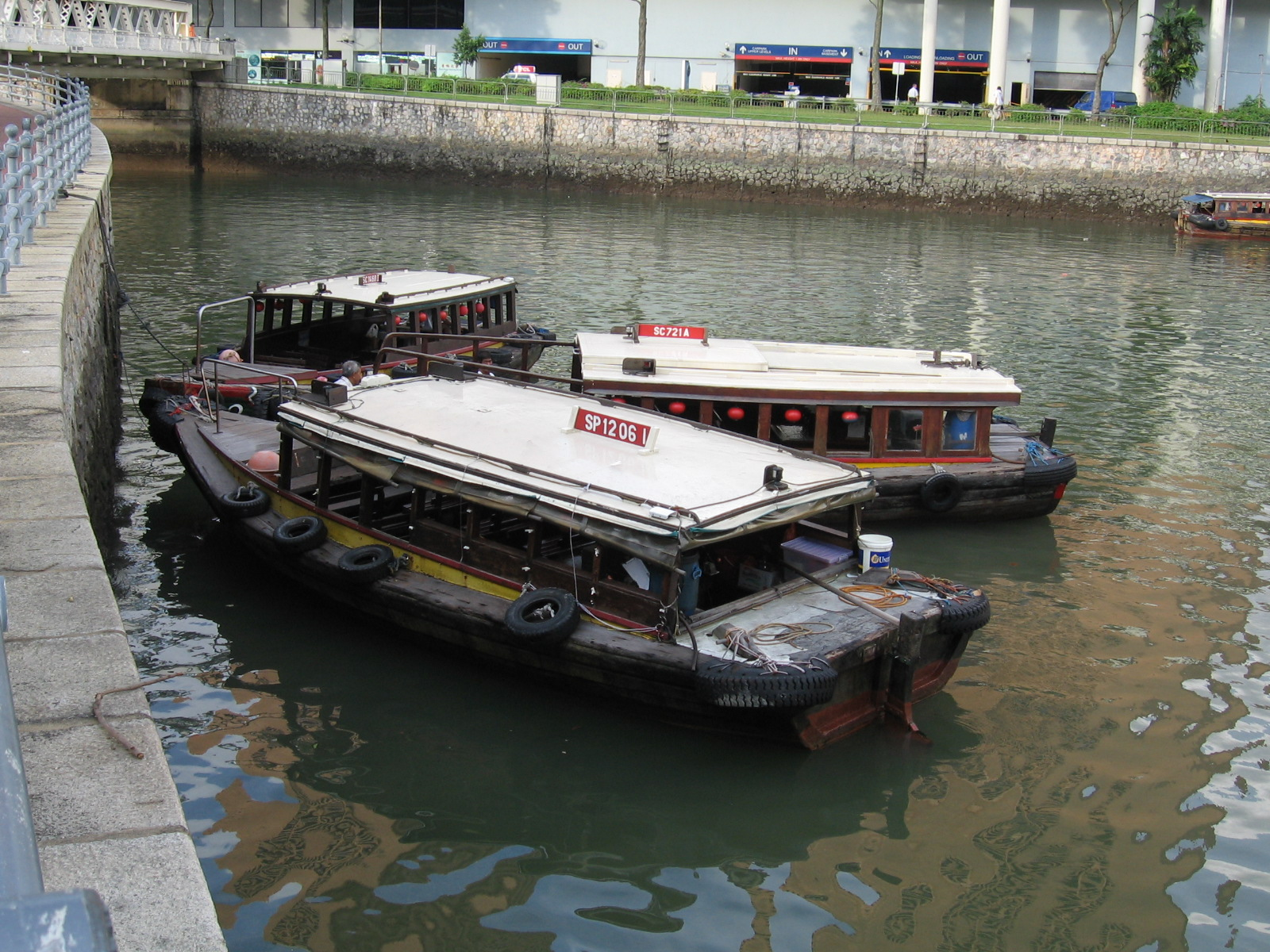
Singapore River

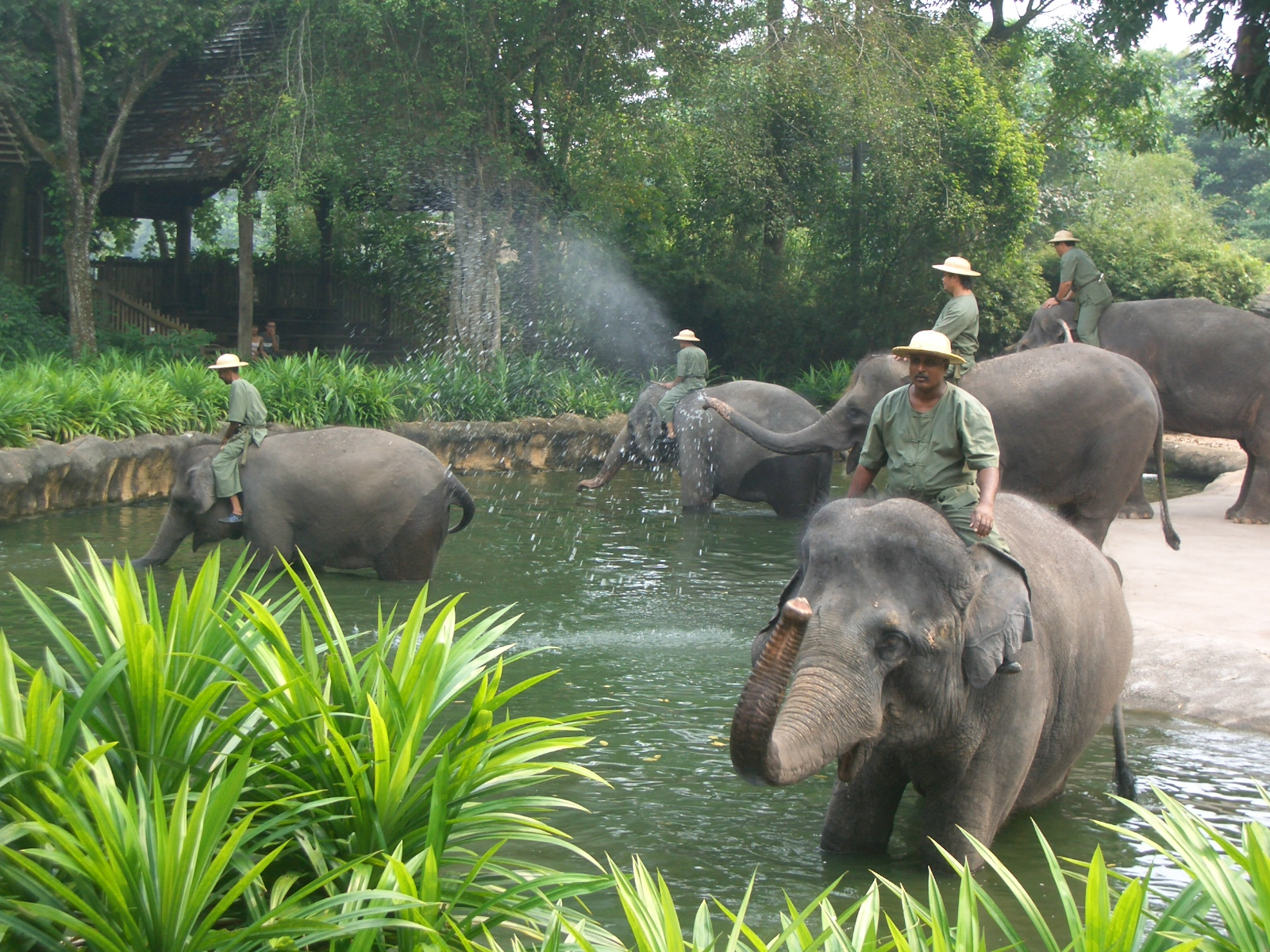
Singapore Zoo

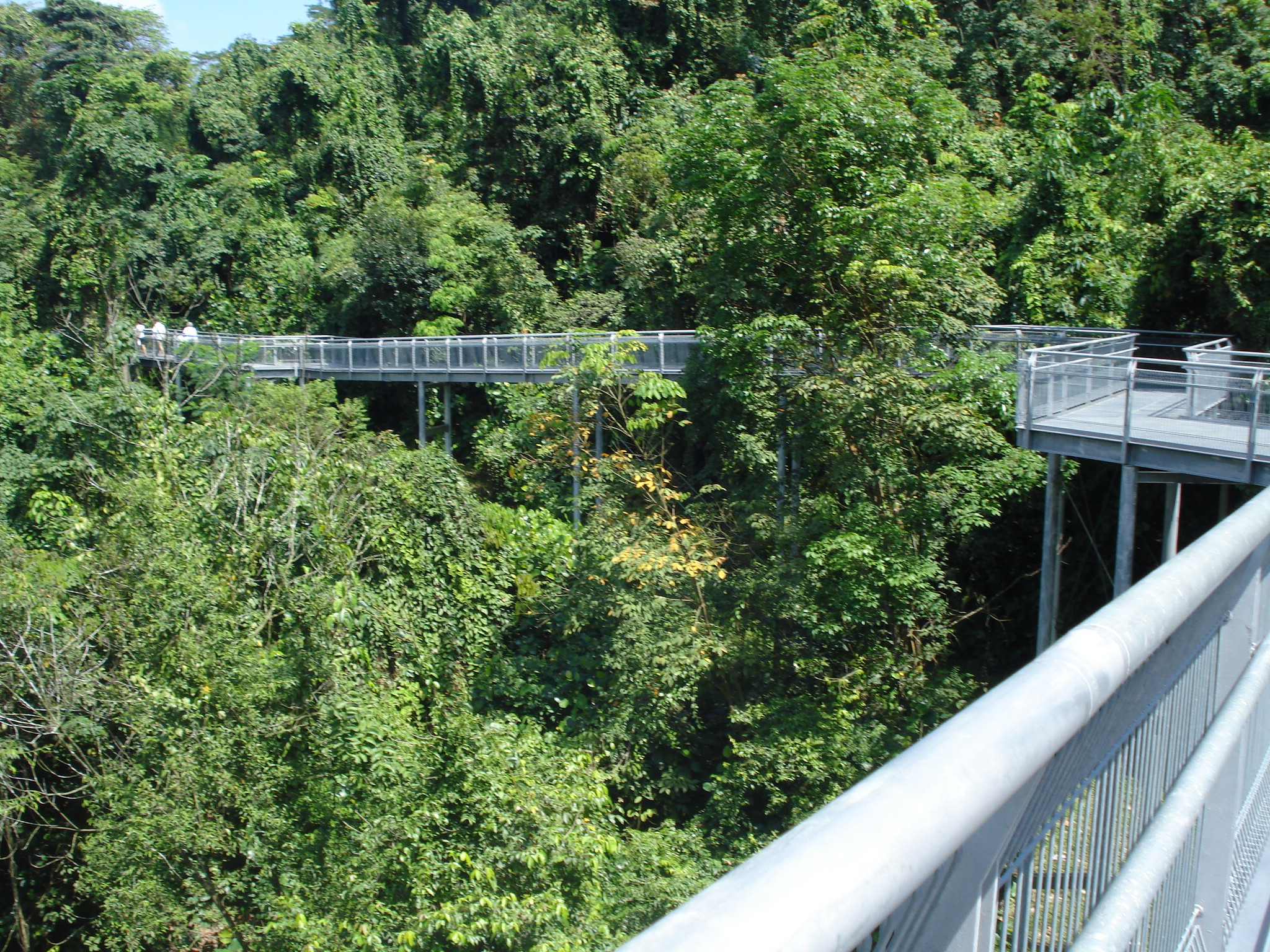
Southern Ridges

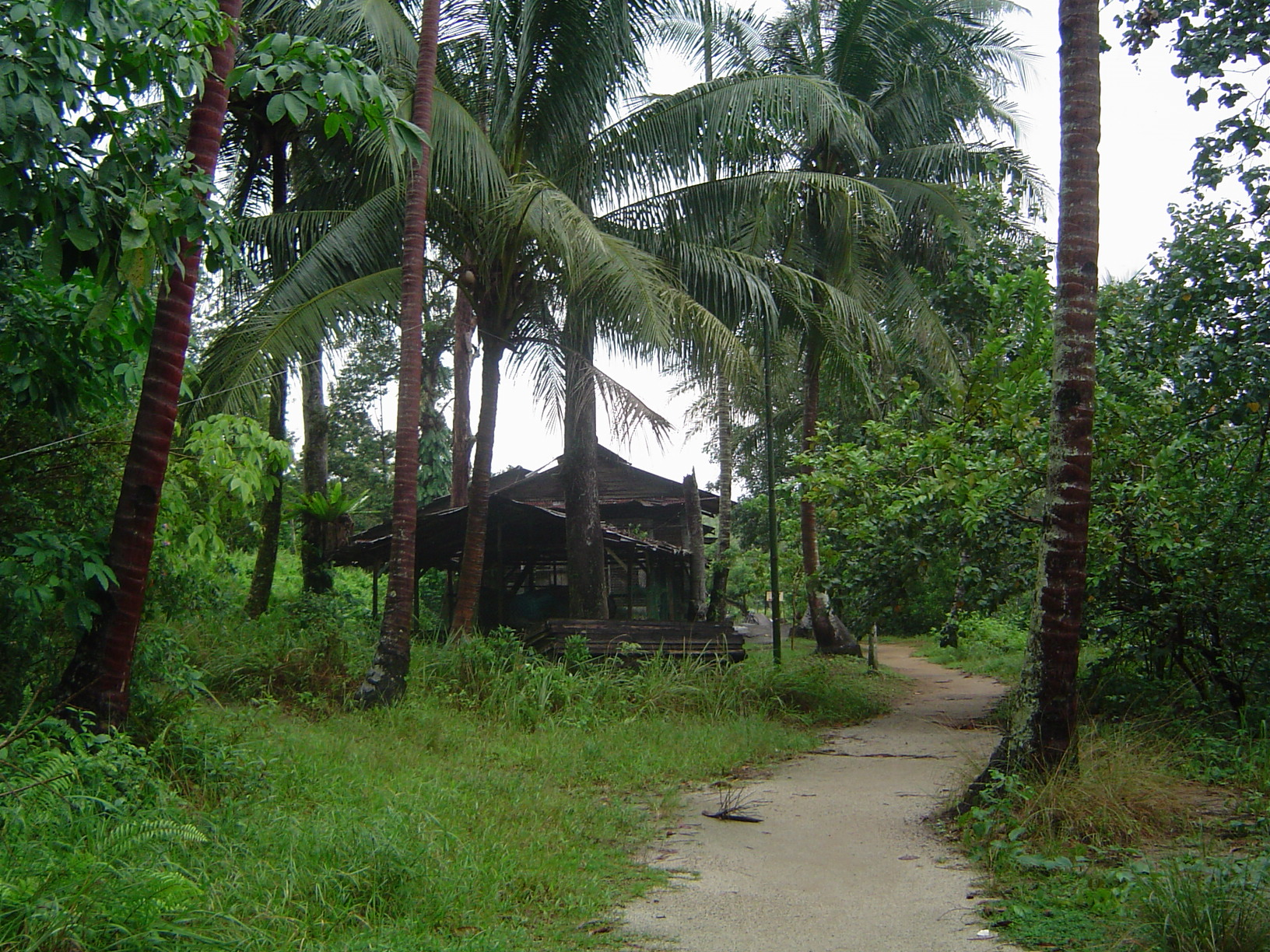
Ubin Island

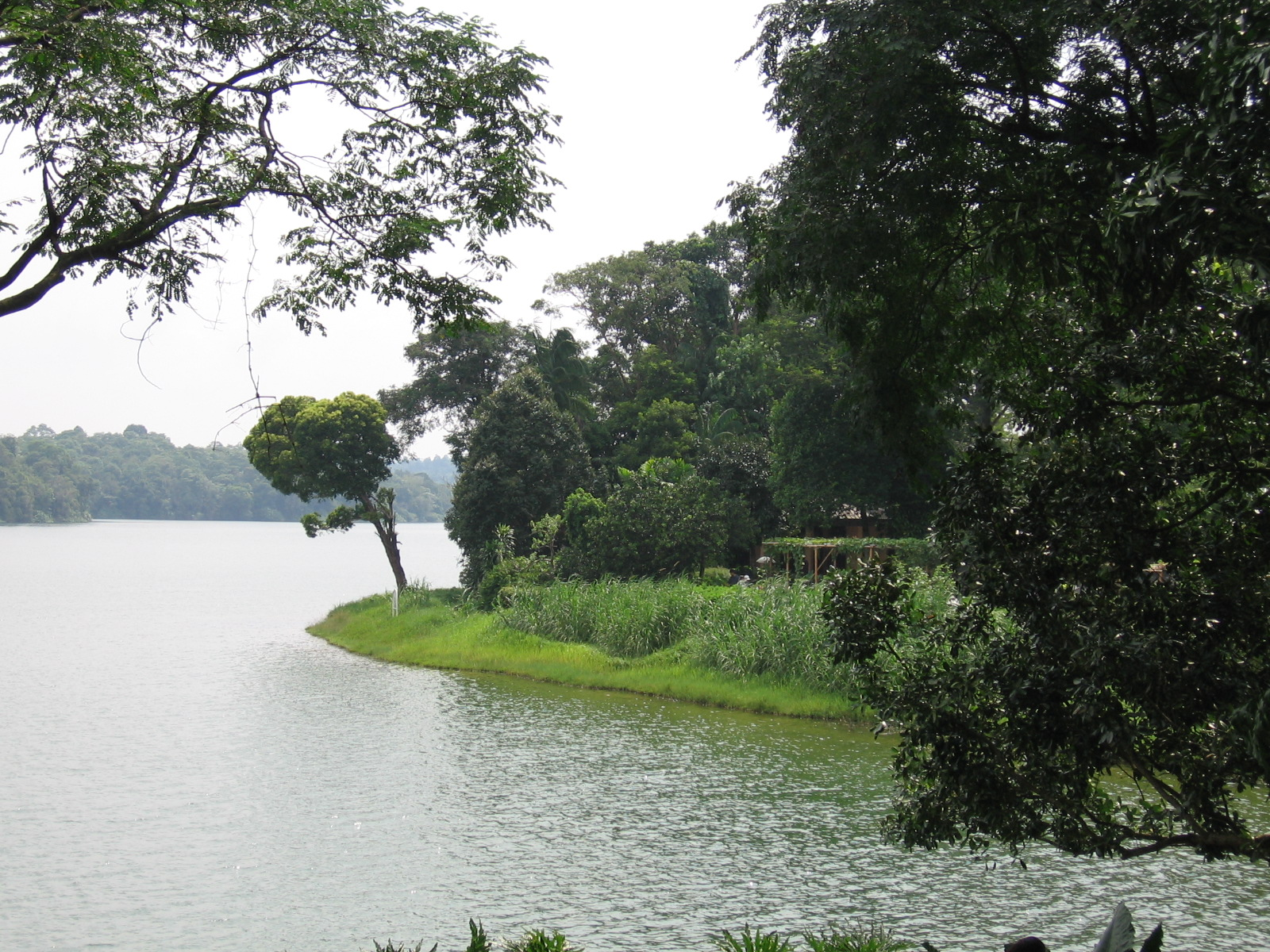
Upper Seletar Reservoir

Popular tourist attractions in Singapore include the following:

== Beaches and bays ==
- East Coast Park
- Marina Bay
- Palawan Beach
- Siloso Beach
- Changi Beach

== Cultural centres ==
- China Cultural Centre

== Educational centres ==
- Science Centre Singapore
- Singapore Discovery Centre
- ArtScience Museum

== Entertainment districts ==
- Boat Quay
- Clarke Quay

== Hills ==
- Bukit Timah
- Mount Faber

== Historical buildings ==
- Baba House
- City Hall
- Empress Place Building
- Fort Canning
- Fort Siloso
- House of Tan Yeok Nee
- Raffles Hotel
- Sri Temasek
- Sun Yat Sen Nanyang Memorial Hall
- Victoria Theatre and Concert Hall

== Infrastructure ==
- Marina Barrage
- URA City Gallery
- Fountain of Wealth

== Islands ==
- Sentosa Island

== Nature ==
- Sungei Buloh Wetland Reserve

== Religious places ==
- Thian Hock Keng
- Yueh Hai Ching Temple
- Hong San See
- Tan Si Chong Su or Poh Chiak Keng
- Kwan Im Thong Hood Cho Temple
- Burmese Buddhist Temple
- Wat Ananda Metyarama Thai Buddhist Temple
- Sri Lankaramaya Buddhist Temple
- Lian Shan Shuang Lin Monastery
- Kong Meng San Phor Kark See Monastery
- Foo Hai Ch'an Monastery
- Buddha Tooth Relic Temple and Museum
- Sri Thendayuthapani Temple
- Sri Mariamman Temple
- Armenian Church, Singapore
- Maghain Aboth Synagogue
- Sultan Mosque
- Qi Tian Gong

== Integrated resorts ==
- Marina Bay Sands
- Resorts World Sentosa

== Shopping districts ==
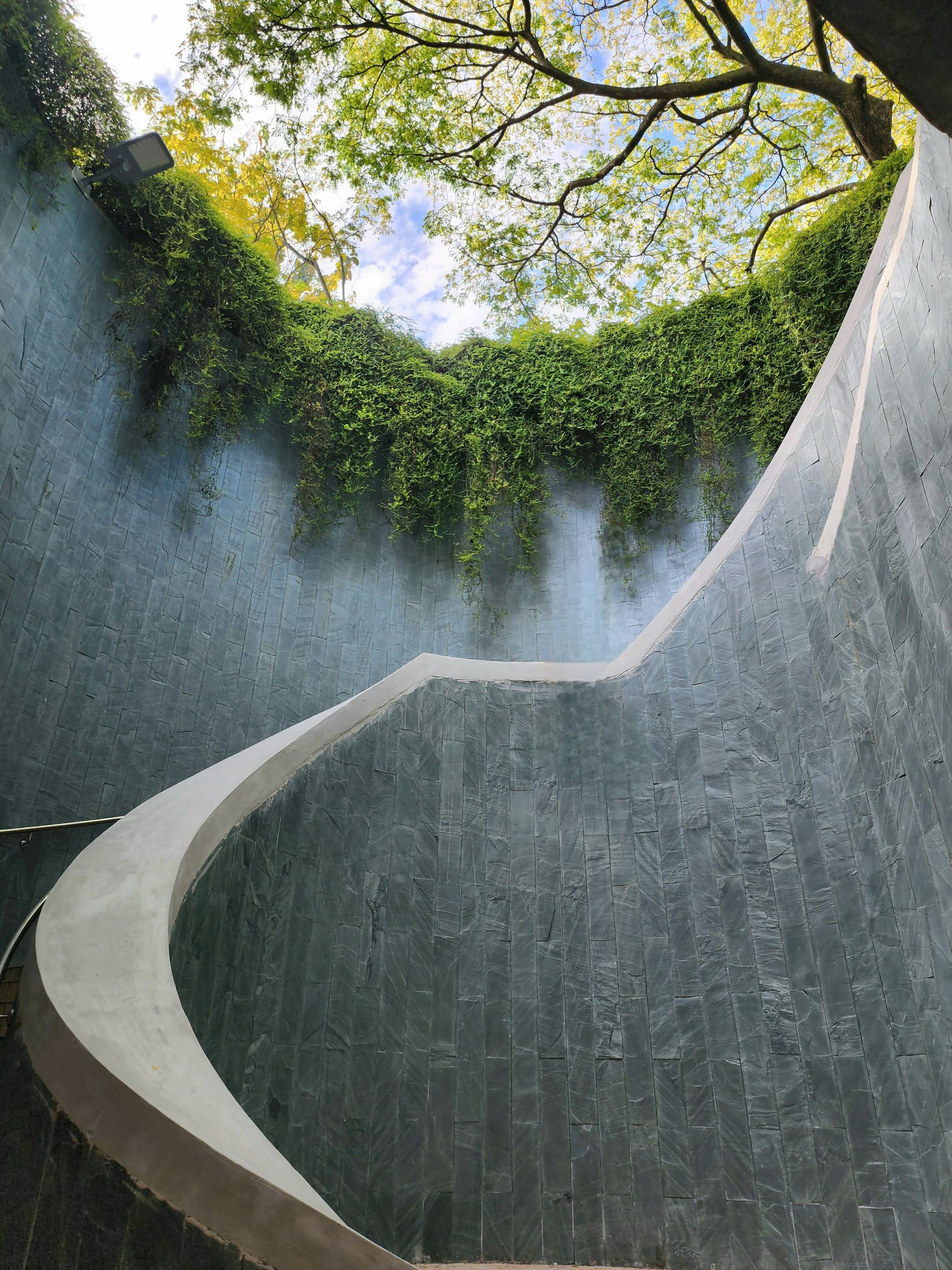
Fort Canning Tunnel

- Arab Street
- Bugis Street
- Chinatown
- Little India
- Orchard Road

== Sports ==
- National Stadium
- Singapore Indoor Stadium

== Theaters ==
- Esplanade – Theatres on the Bay

== Theme parks ==
- Haw Par Villa
- Adventure Cove
- Universal Studios Singapore
- Wild Wild Wet

== Tours ==
- Royal Albatross

== Trails ==
- Helix Bridge
- Southern Ridges

== Zoos ==
- Bird Paradise
- Night Safari
- River Wonders
- Singapore Zoo

== See also ==
- Tourism in Singapore
