= China Cultural Centre (Singapore) =

Coordinates: 1°17′53.4″N 103°51′7.1″E

- 中国文化中心
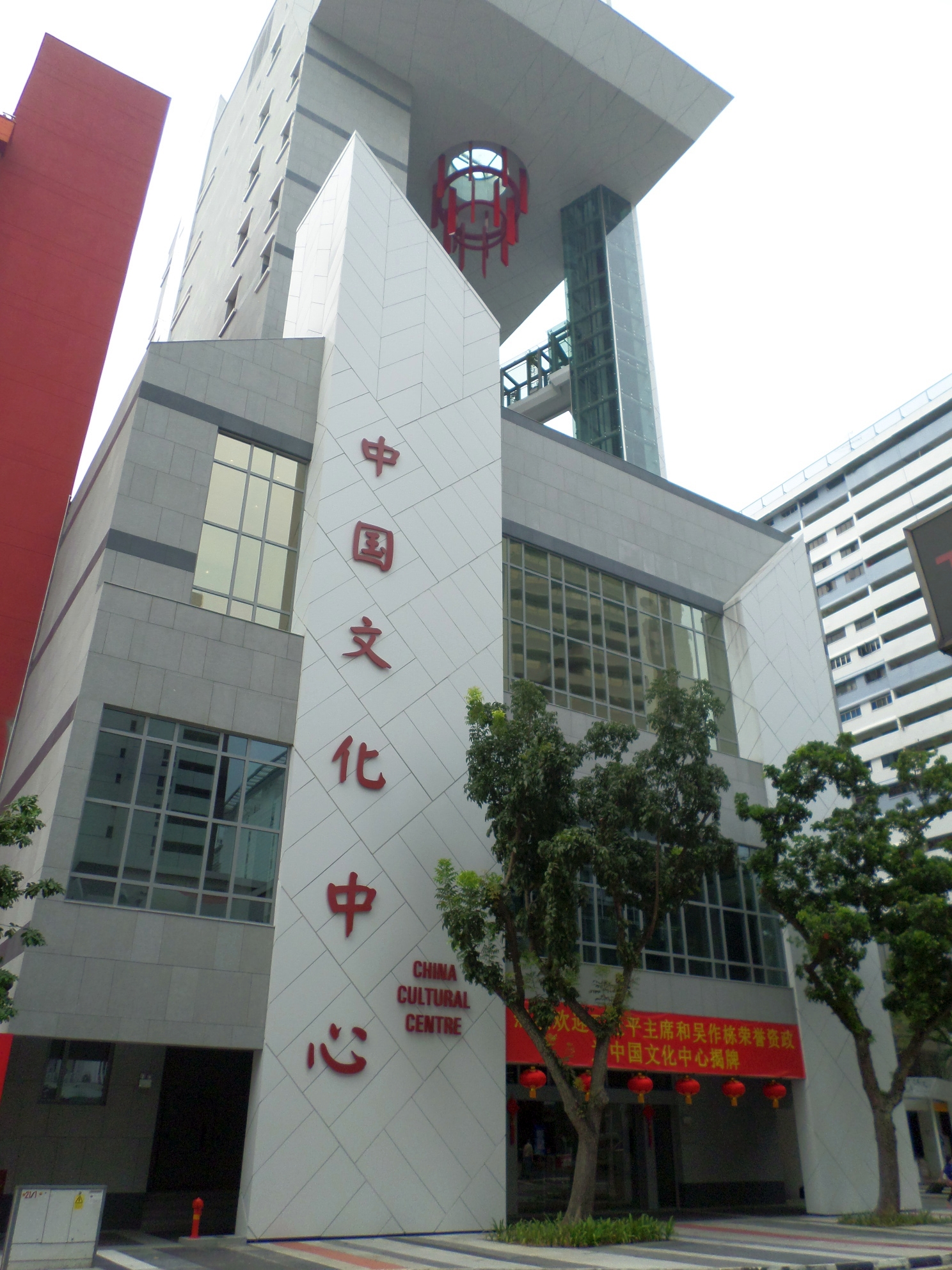
- Interactive map of the China Cultural Centre area

General information
- Type: Cultural centre
- Location: 217 Queen Street, Singapore 188548
- Construction started: January 2013
- Completed: April 2015
- Opening: 7 November 2015
- Cost: S$44 million

Technical details
- Floor count: 11

Design and construction
- Architect: Liu Thai Ker

The China Cultural Centre (Chinese: 中国文化中心) is a cultural institution in Queen Street, Singapore, dedicated to promoting the culture of China.

== History ==
The cultural centre was built at the former People's Association (PA) clubhouse. The groundbreaking ceremony for the cultural centre was held on 15 November 2010 which was officiated by Chinese Vice President Xi Jinping and Singaporean Senior Minister Goh Chok Tong. Construction started from January 2013 and was completed in April 2015. On 7 November 2015, Chinese President Xi Jinping and Singaporean Emeritus Senior Minister Goh Chok Tong officiated the opening ceremony of the center.

=== Distinction ===
This cultural centre should not be confused with the Singapore Chinese Cultural Centre (SCCC), a local charity focused on the heritage and experiences of Chinese Singaporeans, who have lived in Singapore for generations. The SCCC is located at 1 Straits Boulevard and is patronised by Prime Minister Lee Hsien Loong.

== Architecture ==
The cultural centre was designed by architect Liu Thai Ker. It is housed in an 11-story building. It features library, classrooms and multipurpose hall.

== Transportation ==
The cultural center is accessible within walking distance of Bras Basah MRT station.

== See also ==
- List of tourist attractions in Singapore
- China–Singapore relations
