= Monkey King Festival =

Annual celebration in Hong Kong

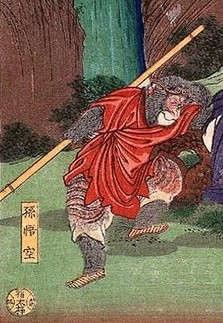
Sun Wukong, the Monkey King

The Monkey King Festival (Chinese: 齊天大聖千秋) is celebrated in Hong Kong on the 16th day of the eighth Lunar month of the Chinese calendar, corresponding to September according to the Common era calendar, a day after the Mid Autumn Festival. The origin of the festival is traced to the epic 16th century novel Journey to the West (Xiyou Ji, 西遊記) written by the Chinese novelist Wu Cheng'en (1500–1582) during the Ming dynasty (1368–1644). The novel brings out the concept of immortality from Taoism and rebirth from Buddhism. The monkey Sun Wukong, a character in the novel, is the featured figure of the festival.

== Story ==
The story has entered into annals of folklore in China. It revolves around Xuanzang, a Buddhist monk during the Tang dynasty (618–907). Harassed by demons and bandits, he visits ancient India, accompanied by his disciples, and protectors, Sun Wukong the Monkey King, Pigsy (猪八戒) and Sandy (沙悟浄). They return to China with Buddhist scriptures. The novel's story became subsumed into the popular culture of China. When the Monkey King appeared in a Buddhist novel, he attained a higher recognition in the cultural ethos of ancient China; temples were built in his honor and his biography was established. The birthday of the Monkey King is observed as the New Year Day, and also as trickster day as he had immeasurable talent and cunning wit.

== Celebration ==
The festival celebration for the Monkey King typically involves burning incense and paper offerings. Taoists celebrate the Monkey King Festival by performing acrobatic moves such as the hurricane-whirl kick. At the Monkey King Temple in Sau Mau Ping, Kowloon, a medium recreates the Monkey King's battle with the other gods in heaven from the novel Journey to the West. The medium is possessed by the spirit of the Monkey King and then runs barefoot across a bed of hot coals before climbing a ladder made of knives. The Monkey King is said to have a bronze head and iron shoulders and is thus unharmed after performing these feats.

== Related customs ==
A different custom, reported by a German missionary from southwest Shandong, relates to the fusion of "heterodox activities with popular culture". It includes calling the spirit of Sun Wukong the Monkey King, at a place which holds rituals. In this festival, four young men are selected for the purpose of inviting Sun Wukong to demonstrate his martial prowess. They fall on their faces at the selected sacred ground and one of them is eventually possessed by the spirit of the Monkey God. The possessed is called ma-pi meaning horse, a term used to define people possessed by spirits. The possessed person is then awakened and given a sword, which he swings around wildly, jumping over tables and benches, displaying a kind of martial art. When the incense kept burning at the venue is extinguished, the young man falls to the ground exhausted. There is also the celebration of his birthday in Singapore.

== Bibliography ==
- Avant, Gerald Rodney (2005). The Magic Lotus Lantern And Other Tales from the Han Chinese. AuthorHouse. p. 129. ISBN 978-1-4184-9278-6.
- Esherick, Joseph W. (1987). The Origins of the Boxer Uprising. University of California Press. pp. 62–63. ISBN 978-0-520-06459-1.
- Stepanchuk, Carol; Wong, Charles Choy (1991). Mooncakes and Hungry Ghosts: Festivals of China. China Books. p. 127. ISBN 978-0-8351-2481-2.
- Melton, J. Gordon (2011). Religious Celebrations: An Encyclopedia of Holidays, Festivals, Solemn Observances, and Spiritual Commemorations. ABC-CLIO. p. 586. ISBN 978-1-59884-205-0.
- Yuan, Haiwang (2006). The Magic Lotus Lantern And Other Tales from the Han Chinese. Libraries Unlimited. pp. 15, 209. ISBN 978-1-59158-294-6.
