= China–Singapore relations =

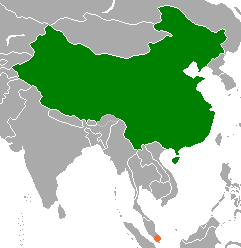
- China: Singapore

Diplomatic mission
- Embassy of China, Singapore: Embassy of Singapore, Beijing

Envoy
- China Ambassador to Singapore Cao Zhongming: Singapore Ambassador to China Peter Tan Hai Chuan

Formal diplomatic relations between the People's Republic of China (PRC) and the Republic of Singapore were established in 1990. Singapore recognised the PRC later than many other countries and the last in Southeast Asia to do so. This delay stemmed from Singapore's preference that its neighbours, particularly Indonesia, normalise relations with the PRC first. After Indonesia and the PRC announced their decision to establish ties on 8 August 1990, Singapore and the PRC began discussions to formalise relations. Three rounds of talks were held, beginning on 27 July 1990, to finalise the establishment of diplomatic ties.

Singapore and China have maintained neutral relations, with Singapore recognising China's growing regional importance while ensuring its own national interests are upheld. Singapore supports constructive Chinese engagement in the Asia-Pacific, but does so on the basis of mutual respect and regional stability. Its co-operation with China, including on security and counterterrorism efforts through ASEAN, reflects Singapore's proactive and independent approach to regional diplomacy. Singapore has also participated in China's waves of industrialization by sharing experiences via state level cooperations in the establishment of China-Singapore Suzhou Industrial Park, Sino-Singapore Tianjin Eco-city, Sino-Singapore Guangzhou Knowledge City, Singapore-Sichuan Hi-Tech Innovation Park and the Sino-Singapore Jilin Food Zone.

While the relationship between the two countries remains strong, it has been strained during numerous high-profile events, especially during the 2010s and 2020s, including Singapore's stance against China regarding the South China Sea dispute, Singapore's support for the United States' military presence and alliance system in Asia and the seizing of Singapore Armed Forces' (SAF) vehicles by Hong Kong authorities in 2016. Singapore also often engages with Taiwan through unofficial channels, with relations shaped by shared economic and military priorities and limited political alignment especially during the Cold War. Singapore's delayed recognition of the PRC stemmed largely from its sustained ties with Taiwan throughout the latter part of the 20th century. Even after recognising the PRC, Singapore has continued informal cooperation with Taiwan in areas such as trade, education and cultural exchanges. While this has occasionally attracted disapproval from Beijing, it reflects Singapore's longstanding commitment to strategic independence and balanced diplomacy.

Despite occasional friction, Singapore and China have maintained a good relationship on a variety of issues—defence, trade, education and infrastructure development. Singapore and China continue to strengthen their bilateral relations and pursue them for mutual benefit rather than out of deference. Its participation in initiatives such as the Belt and Road Initiative reflects a pragmatic approach focused on national interest rather than alignment with China's geopolitical goals. Singapore has also consistently advocated for ASEAN centrality and has sought to mediate between Beijing and the organisation, making clear that its support for regional cooperation does not equate to uncritical endorsement of China's policies.

== History ==
=== Singapore as a British colony and as a part of Malaysia ===
The historic connections between the peoples of Singapore and China date back well before the establishment of the PRC in October 1949. Many early Chinese migrants came to the region known as Nanyang seeking to escape poverty and conflict during the Qing dynasty. A significant portion of ethnic Chinese Singaporeans trace their ancestral origins to southern Chinese provinces such as Fujian, Guangdong and Hainan.

During the Second Sino-Japanese War, which later became part of the larger World War II, many ethnic Chinese in Malaya and Singapore strongly supported China. This included providing aid to both the Kuomintang (KMT) and the Chinese Communist Party (CCP) in their fight against Japanese forces. After Japan's conquest in the Malayan campaign and the Fall of Singapore, the Japanese retaliated with harsh reprisals against the ethnic Chinese population through operations such as Sook Ching, resulting in tens of thousands of deaths. The Malayan People's Anti-Japanese Army (MPAJA), initially a resistance group, later evolved into the communist-aligned Malayan National Liberation Army (MNLA). During the subsequent Malayan Emergency and Second Malayan Emergency, the communist insurgency under the Malayan Communist Party (MCP) was viewed as an extension of China's revolutionary influence in Southeast Asia. However, China ended its support for the MCP following the establishment of diplomatic ties between Malaysia and China in 1974.

Ethnic Chinese in Singapore (and also in Malaya) were early supporters of MCP, which led to suspicion from the British colonial authorities and later from the ruling People's Action Party (PAP). Chinese-language secondary schools and Nanyang University were viewed as hotbeds of communist activity. The government's efforts to curb communist influence included major events such as the Chinese middle schools riots and Operation Cold Store. Nanyang University was eventually reorganised and merged with the University of Singapore to form the National University of Singapore (NUS).

=== Post–Singapore independence ===
Lee Kuan Yew, Singapore's first Prime Minister of Singapore, was careful to avoid any perception among Southeast Asian nations that Singapore, with its predominantly ethnic Chinese population, was a "Third China" alongside the Republic of China (ROC, Taiwan) and the People's Republic of China (PRC). This caution stemmed from Singapore's experiences with communism, the ongoing Vietnam War and domestic political factors. Consequently, Singapore delayed establishing diplomatic relations with China until other Southeast Asian countries had done so in order to avoid appearing biased towards China. Lee's official visits to China from 1976 onwards were conducted in English to reaffirm that he represented Singapore, not a "Third China".

During this era, Lee firmly believed in resisting communism in line with the domino theory. Having witnessed the British failure to defend Singapore in World War II and doubting the United States’ willingness to defend Singapore against communism, Lee welcomed the American presence in the region as a necessary counterbalance to the Soviet Union and China. In the 1970s, Singapore and China began unofficial relations, which led to the exchange of Trade Offices in September 1981. Commercial air services between Singapore and mainland China commenced in 1985. Formal diplomatic relations were finally established on 3 October 1990, making Singapore the last Southeast Asian country to officially recognise the PRC.

Despite maintaining strong relations with China, Singapore continues to uphold unofficial ties with Taiwan, including a military training and facilities agreement dating back to 1975, with annual official exercises known as Exercise Starlight (星光計畫). This arrangement exists due to Singapore's limited land area. During the 2000s, China tried to offer Singapore the option to move its training facilities to Hainan. In 2004, prior to Prime Minister Lee Hsien Loong assuming office, he visited Taiwan to understand recent developments there. China objected strongly to the visit because of Taiwan's sensitive political status. Later that year, China put bilateral relations on hold. In his first National Day Rally speech, Lee expressed concern that Taiwanese leaders and citizens might have overestimated the level of support they would receive from the international community if they were to declare independence, reflecting Singapore's cautious approach towards maintaining regional stability.

== Diplomatic events and perspectives ==
China has its embassy on Tanglin Road in Singapore, while Singapore's embassy in Beijing on Jianguomen Wai Avenue, Chaoyang District was established in 1990, and it has Consulates-General in Chengdu, Guangzhou, Shanghai, and Xiamen, as well as Hong Kong, known during the era of British rule as the Singapore Commission.

=== South China Sea dispute ===
While Singapore is not a party to the territorial disputes in the South China Sea, it has an interest in the outcome of these disputes since they have implications for international law, freedom of navigation, and ASEAN unity. Singapore's outspoken stance on the South China Sea is viewed by Chinese policymakers as taking the side of the US and other claimant states as well as attempting to internationalise the dispute. In September 2016, Chinese Communist Party tabloid Global Times accused Singapore of supporting the Philippines v. China ruling in favour of the Philippines during the Non-Aligned Movement meeting in Venezuela, based on unnamed sources. The Global Times' account was disputed by Singapore's ambassador to China, Stanley Loh. Earlier in August, Chinese diplomat Hua Chunying stated: "China hopes that Singapore...can maintain an objective and fair position as the coordinator of China and Asean dialogue relations, so as to advance Sino-Singapore relations and healthy and stable China-Asean ties."

=== 2016 Terrex seizure incident ===
In November 2016, nine Singapore Army Terrex ICV armoured personnel carriers and associated equipment were seized by the Hong Kong Customs and Excise Department at the Kwai Tsing Container Terminal (formerly Kwai Chung Container Terminal). The vehicles and equipment were being shipped back to Singapore from Taiwan after a military exercise in Taiwan. The shipment was allegedly seized because American President Lines (APL), the private shipping company engaged by the Singapore military to handle the shipment, did not have the appropriate permits for the vehicles equipment, though it has been alleged that China manufactured the incident to protest against the Singaporean Army's use of Taiwan for training against the backdrop of worsening ties between both states then. The shipment was later moved to the Hong Kong Customs depot at Hong Kong River Trade Terminal and kept indoors since 6 December 2016. This was Hong Kong's biggest seizure of such equipment in the past twenty years. On 24 January 2017, Hong Kong Customs announced that the military vehicles would be returned to Singapore. Commissioner of the Customs and Excise Department, Roy Tang Yun-kwong, said that shipping company American President Lines would likely face criminal charges over the incident for suspected breach of the Hong Kong Law. In 2019, American President Lines and the captain of the involved ship was charged with violating the Import and Export (Strategic Commodities) Regulations, which they both pleaded not guilty to. In April 2019, they were found guilty, with American President Lines sentenced to 90,000 HKD in fines (10,000 HKD for each vehicle), and the captain sentenced to 9,000 HKD in fines (1,000 HKD for each vehicle) and 3 months of jail time (suspended for 1.5 years).

=== Taiwan ===
Since 1975, Singapore has conducted regular military training exercises with the Republic of China Armed Forces, a longstanding defence arrangement that continues despite objections from Beijing. Ties between Singapore and Taiwan extend beyond the military sphere and include decades of close co-operation in trade, education and technology. In 1993, Singapore hosted the historic Wang–Koo summit, the first formal meeting between Chinese and Taiwanese officials since 1949, underscoring its role as a trusted intermediary in cross-strait relations. Singapore also hosted the First Ma–Xi meeting, which marked the first encounter between the top political leaders of both sides of the Taiwan Strait since the conclusion of the Chinese Civil War in 1949. It was the first such meeting since Chiang Kai-shek and Mao Zedong held talks in Chongqing during the Double Tenth Agreement negotiations in August 1945.

Despite pressure from China, Singapore has maintained its unofficial ties with Taiwan as a matter of strategic autonomy and principled engagement. Singapore has consistently emphasised the importance of peace and stability in the Taiwan Strait, while avoiding entanglement in cross-strait disputes. On 4 November 2021, Defence Minister Ng Eng Hen acknowledged Taiwan's political status as a highly sensitive issue for China, warning of the grave consequences of any military conflict and stating, "I would advise us to stay very far away from that." Nonetheless, Singapore's engagement with Taiwan continues to draw criticism from Beijing, such as in January 2024 when Singapore extended formal congratulations to President-elect Lai Ching-te, prompting a diplomatic rebuke from China. Singapore officially opposes Taiwan independence.

== Economics ==
The bilateral trade between China and Singapore developed rapidly in recent years and Singapore has maintained the first position among ASEAN countries in their trade with China. China's transformation into a major economic power in the 21st century has led to an increase of foreign investments in the bamboo network, a network of overseas Chinese businesses operating in the markets of Southeast Asia that share common family and cultural ties.

In 1998, volume of trade was US$8.154 billion In 1999, the trade value has increased to US$8.56 billion. In 2000, the amount increased to US$10.821 billion. In 2009, the total trade volume was SGD 75.1 billion (US$58.4 billion).

As of 2013, Singapore was China's 9th largest trading partner.

China's exports to Singapore were textiles, clothing, agriculture produce, petrochemical, metals, electromechanical equipment, feed, coking coal, shipping, machinery supplier, communication equipment and electronic components.

Companies such as Capitaland and Breadtalk have made substantial inroads into China's domestic economy.

Singapore is a significant destination for Chinese outbound foreign direct investment. Singaporean investment in China became particularly important to Singapore during the 1990s, as Singapore sought to adjust its economic model.

=== Cooperation projects ===
Suzhou Industrial Park developed as a result of high-level intergovernmental cooperation between China and Singapore. In the late 1980s, Singapore's export-driven economic model required adjustment for further growth and Singapore's government viewed investment in China as part of its policy adjustment. Through its Regional Industrial Parks program, Singapore proposed to develop industrial manufacturing locations in other Asian countries, modeled after its own Jurong Industrial Estate. In 1993, Prime Minister of Singapore Lee Kuan Yew contacted Vice Premier Zhu Rongji and proposed a government-to-government cooperation program to develop an industrial estate on an unbuilt site in Suzhou. The next year, the two countries signed the Agreement on the Joint Development of Suzhou Industrial Park.

In 2007, China and Singapore began the Sino-Singapore Tianjin Eco-City project.

Singapore joined the Belt and Road Initiative (BRI) in 2018.

== Culture and education ==
A Confucius Institute in Singapore was established in 2005 as a collaboration with Nanyang Technological University (NTU), the successor to the former Chinese-language Nanyang University. Its stated mission is to provide Singapore with a platform for learning the Chinese language and culture and to enhance communication with other Chinese communities. In November 2015, China opened the China Cultural Centre in Singapore to facilitate exchanges in arts and culture. Current difficulties notwithstanding, Singapore's economically successful dominant party system has led its political system to be studied and cited as a potential model for China's government. Such a viewpoint has been institutionalised: Nanyang Technological University offers master's degree programs that are well-attended by Chinese public officials.

Singapore's attractiveness to Chinese students largely stems from its high-quality education system, safe urban environment and regional proximity. While some are drawn by perceived shared language and traditions, others explicitly cite Singapore's meritocratic environment as a key distinction from the mainland's guanxi-oriented norms. A 2016 study on Chinese students' integration showed generally positive interactions between them and the Singaporeans surveyed, although only about 26% of students were active in local events and activities. Singapore's Chinese-language Lianhe Zaobao has also long served as an outlet of Singapore's regional soft power. While it is read by Chinese audiences and officials, its periodic censorship inside China, including blackouts in 2009 and 2019 for critical reporting on issues such as internet controls and the 2019–2020 Hong Kong protests, further highlights Singapore's independence in managing its media and public discourse.

=== Immigration and people-to-people relations ===
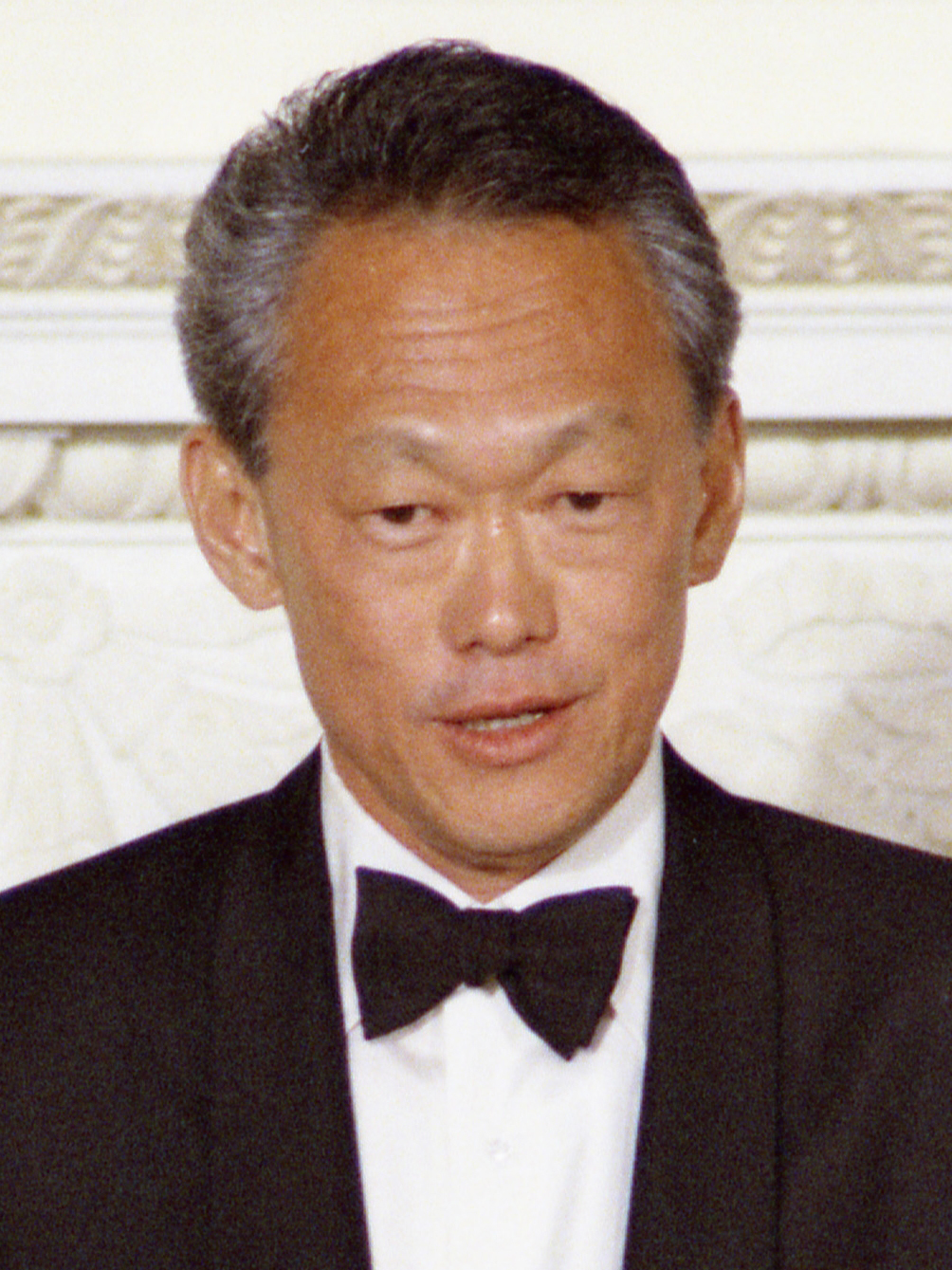
Prime Minister Lee Kuan Yew consistently affirmed Singapore's distinct ethnic identity in both bilateral relations with China and domestic policy. He made clear that Singaporean Chinese are culturally, politically and socially different from the Chinese in China, emphasising that shared ancestry does not translate into shared allegiance or values.

Chinese people have immigrated to what is known as Singapore since Zheng He's voyages in the 15th century; those early immigrants integrated into the host societies, and their descendants are now known as Peranakans.

While the majority of Singaporeans are of ethnic Chinese descent at around 70 to 75%, this demographic fact is often misinterpreted by some in China, who assume that Singapore is culturally aligned and ideologically sympathetic to Chinese interests. In reality, the Chinese community in Singapore has diverged significantly from that in China, having been shaped by centuries of migration, multiculturalism, colonial legacy and independent nation-building. This misconception was evident in early bilateral exchanges, where Chinese officials referred to visiting Singaporeans as "kinsmen". While Prime Minister Lee Kuan Yew acknowledged a "special relationship", he firmly rejected the notion of ideological or emotional kinship, stating, "We are different like the New Zealanders and the Australians are different from the British... I have no ideological empathy." His response underscored Singapore's distinct national identity and independent worldview, particularly in economic and political matters.

In 2012, some Chinese netizens began referring to Singapore as "Po County" (坡县), a label that many Singaporeans found deeply offensive. While a few Chinese commenters viewed it as a harmless or affectionate nickname, the implication that Singapore is merely a minor appendage of China was widely condemned. Many Singaporeans, regardless of ethnicity, saw the term as a patronising and dismissive attempt to diminish the country's sovereignty and independence.

The Singaporean Chinese today are overwhelmingly locally born and raised, with only a small minority comprising first-generation immigrants from China. They possess no allegiance to either the People's Republic of China (PRC) or the Republic of China (Taiwan), and instead identify firmly with Singapore's national identity and multicultural society. Singapore's historical experience with racial riots has made social harmony a top national priority, and the government has invested decades of effort in cultivating a cohesive, inclusive identity that places Singapore first, above all ethnic and foreign affiliations.

Despite this, misalignment between Singapore's national identity and the attitudes of some newcomers from mainland China has resulted in tension. Incidents such as the curry dispute, the 2012 Singapore bus drivers' strike, and an infamous fatal speeding accident caused by a wealthy Chinese national, have stoked public frustration. These cases are viewed by many locals as emblematic of certain Chinese immigrants' failure to respect or integrate into Singapore's multicultural society.

Singaporeans' firm sense of national identity is reflected in how they respond to perceived foreign encroachments, even in symbolic domains like sport. Olympic medals won by China-born athletes who had only recently obtained Singaporean citizenship were not widely celebrated by the local population compared to native-born winners, who saw them as "mercenaries" rather than true Singaporean champions. This reflects the fact that Singapore's national identity is grounded in historical experience and a state-building process developed independently of China. Efforts to assert cultural affinity or political alignment based solely on ethnic similarity are considered inaccurate and inappropriate by Singaporeans, including by its leadership.

== Security and military relations ==
In 2002, it was revealed that China had officially proposed relocating Singapore's military training operations from Taiwan to Hainan. However, Singapore declined the offer, choosing to maintain its long-standing defence arrangements with Taiwan. In 2008, both countries signed the Agreement on Defense Exchanges and Security Cooperation, facilitating limited interactions such as official visits, port calls and professional exchanges. In 2009, Exercise Cooperation, the first bilateral army exercise, was held in Guilin, China, followed by a joint counterterrorism exercise in 2010 and 2014.

In 2019, Exercise Cooperation was held in Singapore and involved the Singapore Army's 3rd Singapore Division and 1st Commando Battalion alongside the People's Liberation Army’s 74th Army Group. An enhanced Agreement on Defence Exchanges and Security Cooperation was signed in 2019. Military activities were paused during the COVID-19 pandemic, and resumed in 2022 with agreements on defence education and exchanges.

=== Cyber ===
SingHealth medical data was hacked by suspected Chinese state-sponsored hackers around July 2018. In July 2025, K. Shanmugam, Singapore's Coordinating Minister for National Security, stated that the country's critical infrastructure was attacked by UNC3886, a cyber-espionage group previously linked to the Chinese government. Singapore's Cyber Security Agency was deployed in the response to the attacks.

On 7 June 2026, Singapore ordered YouTube, Facebook and X to block 14 posts that targeted the Indian community in Singapore and questioned the country's multiracial policies. Authorities said the content had likely originated from Chinese online platforms before spreading across social media, and accused it of promoting anti-Indian sentiment and racial division. The government described the posts as an attempt to undermine social harmony.

== Public opinion ==
In July 2020, Singaporean journalist Maria Siow reported that many mainland Chinese, echoing official narratives, tend to view Singapore as a model for China. This perception stems from Singapore's status as a one-party dominant state, which is often characterised by political stability, limited dissent and low corruption. Singapore is also credited with having contributed to China's development during the period of reform and opening up, and Lee Kuan Yew is widely regarded by Chinese observers as an exemplary leader.

Singapore enjoys generally favourable views among Chinese respondents, as shown by multiple surveys conducted over recent years. A November 2020 study by scholars from the Lee Kuan Yew School of Public Policy and the University of British Columbia found that 69% of Chinese participants held positive opinions of Singapore. Similarly, a March 2022 survey funded by the European Regional Development Fund and conducted by the Central European Institute of Asian Studies reported that most mainland Chinese respondents viewed Singapore positively and regarded Singaporeans as friendly to Chinese travellers. Furthermore, according to a 2022 survey by Renmin University of China and the Global Times Research Center on Chinese views of ASEAN, Singapore was identified as the most appealing ASEAN member to Chinese respondents. According to a 2026 feeling thermometer poll by the Carter Center and Emory University, Chinese opinion of Singapore was on average 50 out of 100.

From the Singaporean perspective, favourable views of China remain strong. Polling data from Pew Research Center in 2022 and 2024 showed that 67% of Singaporeans expressed a positive view of China. A separate 2022 survey by the Central European Institute of Asian Studies similarly showed most Singaporean respondents holding positive views of China. According to Jamestown Foundation analyst Russell Hsiao in 2019, support for China in Singapore is generationally divided, with older Chinese Singaporeans generally expressing stronger affinity, while younger generations tend to feel less connected to China. A survey published in 2026 by the Pew Research Center found that 73% of Singaporeans had a favorable view of China, while 27% had an unfavorable view.

== Resident diplomatic missions ==
of China in Singapore

- Singapore (Embassy)

of Singapore in China

- Beijing (Embassy)
- Chengdu (Consulate-General)
- Guangzhou (Consulate-General)
- Hong Kong (Consulate-General)
- Shanghai (Consulate-General)
- Xiamen (Consulate-General)

== See also ==
- ASEAN–China Free Trade Area
- Bamboo network
