= Omni-Theatre, Science Centre Singapore =

Observatory and IMAX film theatre in the Science Centre, Singapore

Coordinates: 1°20′04.4″N 103°44′06.9″E

Omni-Theatre
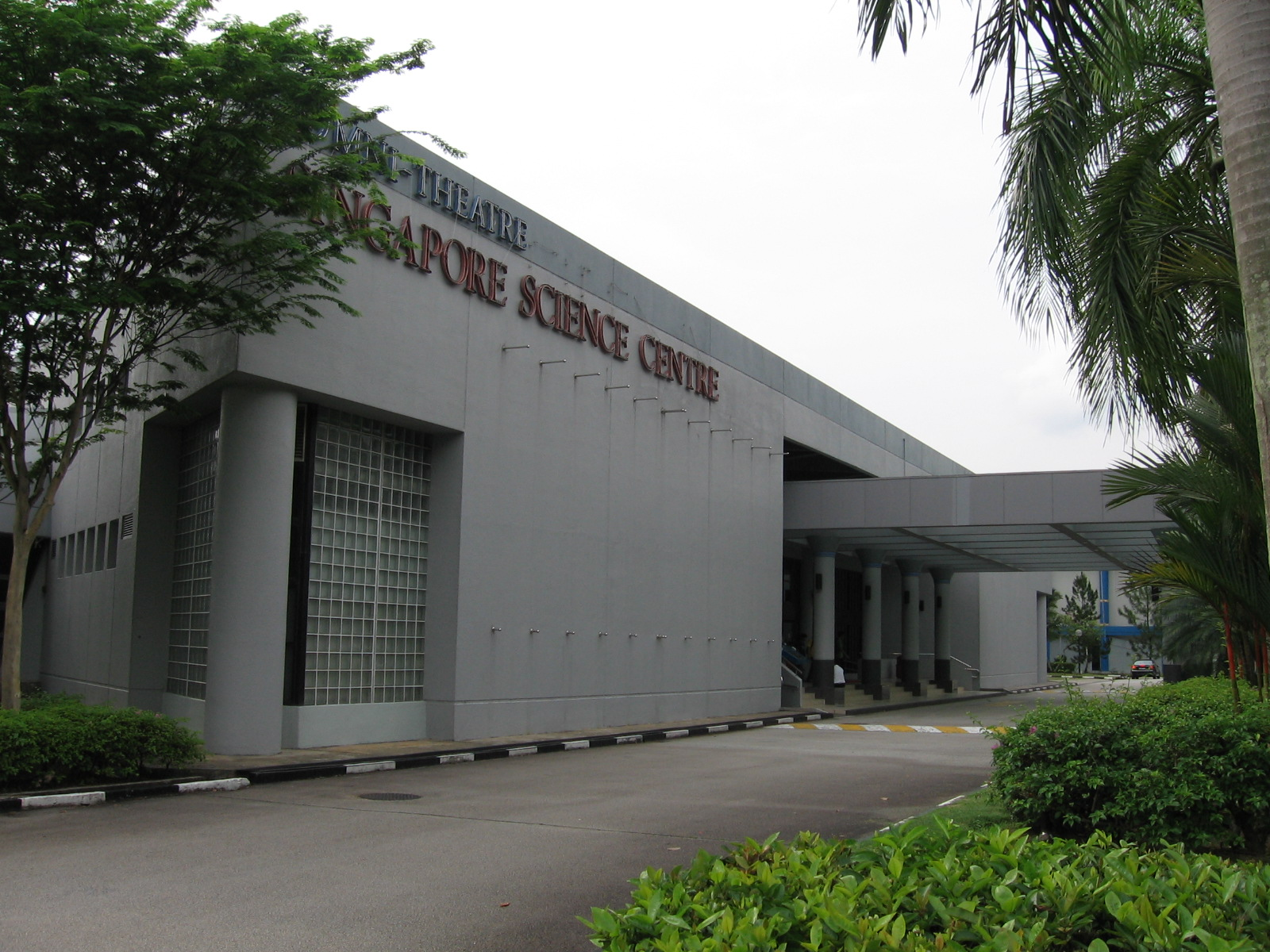
- Omni-Theatre, Science Centre Singapore, Singapore in November 2005

- Location within Singapore
- Address: 21 Jurong Town Hall Road, Singapore 609433
- Location: Science Centre Singapore, Jurong East, Singapore
- Capacity: 221
- Type: omniplanetarium theater

Construction
- Opened: 10 December 1987; 38 years ago
- Renovated: 30 May 2015; 11 years ago
- Cost: S$15 million

Website
- www.science.edu.sg/visit-us/omni-theatre

The Omni-Theatre is an observatory and large-format film theatre located at the Science Centre Singapore (formerly Singapore Science Centre) in Jurong East, Singapore.

== Facilities ==
It was officially opened on 10 December 1987 by the 4th President of Singapore Wee Kim Wee as an expansion of the larger Science Centre, it specifically encompasses an observatory, an omniplanetarium, and a domed projection system to show movies relating to science, astronomy, etc. A simulation theatre, exhibition room, classroom, restaurant, and gift shop are also located on the premises.

== The Observatory ==
As one of the few observatories in the world located next to the Equator, constellations in both the northern and southern celestial hemispheres can be observed and thus opens up more vistas in the sky for observers.

The main telescope of the Observatory is a 40-cm Cassegrain reflector of combined focal length 520-cm. The sub-telescope is a 15-cm apochromatic Kepler refractor of focal length 180-cm. The equatorial mount for the telescopes was designed for its location; the accompanying English yoke provides the necessary stability for the drive and tracking mechanisms. The 5.5-metre stainless steel dome can be made to swivel in any direction and its shutter can be made to slide open for the telescope to be focused onto interesting objects in the sky.

The observatory is situated at geographical coordinates: 1° 20' 03" N latitude 103° 44' 14" E longitude 15.27 m Height (m.s.l)

== The theatre ==
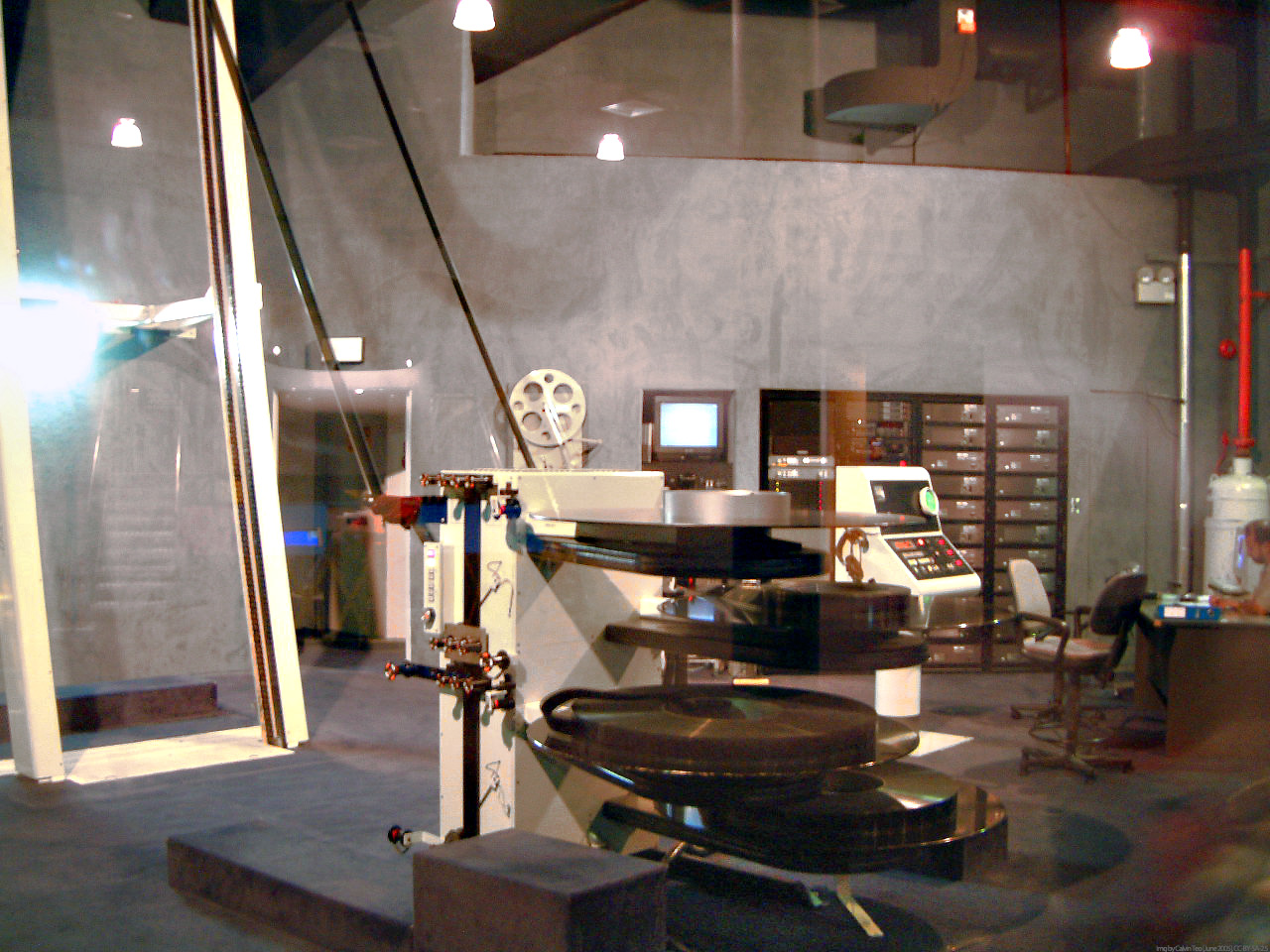
Interior of the former IMAX Dome control room at Omni-Theatre, June 2005.

The theatre consists of a massive hemispheric screen, twenty-three metres in diameter. This screen is sixteen metres or about five storeys high, and is made up of 376 pieces of vinyl-coated aluminium panels, covering a surface of 625 m^{2}. The material achieves 30% reflectivity, ensuring immense clarity.

About 43 million perforations in the screen allow both sound and air-conditioning to pass through to the audience. Stretching 180 degrees horizontal from wall to wall and tilted at a 30-degree angle to the horizon, the screen "wraps" over the audience to cover 80% of a hemisphere so that the images far exceed a person's field of vision. The theatre was originally opened with a seating capacity of 276 and was the first dedicated IMAX Dome/OMNIMAX theatre, and the first overall IMAX installation, in Southeast Asia. A refurbishment in 2015 saw the theatre's seating capacity reduced to 221, and the original IMAX Dome analogue film system was replaced with a new Evans & Sutherland "8K" Digistar 5 digital planetarium theatre system.
