= Tiong Bahru Monkey God Temple =

Taoist temple in Tiong Bahru, Singapore

Coordinates: 1°17′02″N 103°50′04″E

Qi Tian Gong (simplified Chinese: 齐天宫; traditional Chinese: 齊天宮), commonly referred to as the Tiong Bahru Monkey God Temple, is a Taoist temple in Tiong Bahru, Singapore.

Reportedly the first temple in the country dedicated to the Journey to the West character Sun Wukong (also known as the Monkey King), Qi Tian Gong was established in 1920. It was originally located in an attap dwelling but relocated to a rented shophouse at 44 Eng Hoon Street in 1938. In 1985, the temple's trustees bought over the shophouse. The temple houses more than ten statues of the Monkey King, some of which date back to the 1910s.

As part of the temple's yearly festivities, devotees will walk around Tiong Bahru with Monkey King idols. Joss paper will also be burnt while the burning area is purified with a snake-headed whip. Until 2018, the temple also had a medium who would be possessed by the Monkey God.
