= Kampong Bugis =

- Subzone of Kallang Planning Area

Other transcription(s)
  - Chinese: 甘榜武吉士
  - Malay: Kampung Bugis
  - Jawi: كامڤوڠ بوڬيس
  - Tamil: கம்போங் பூகிஸ்
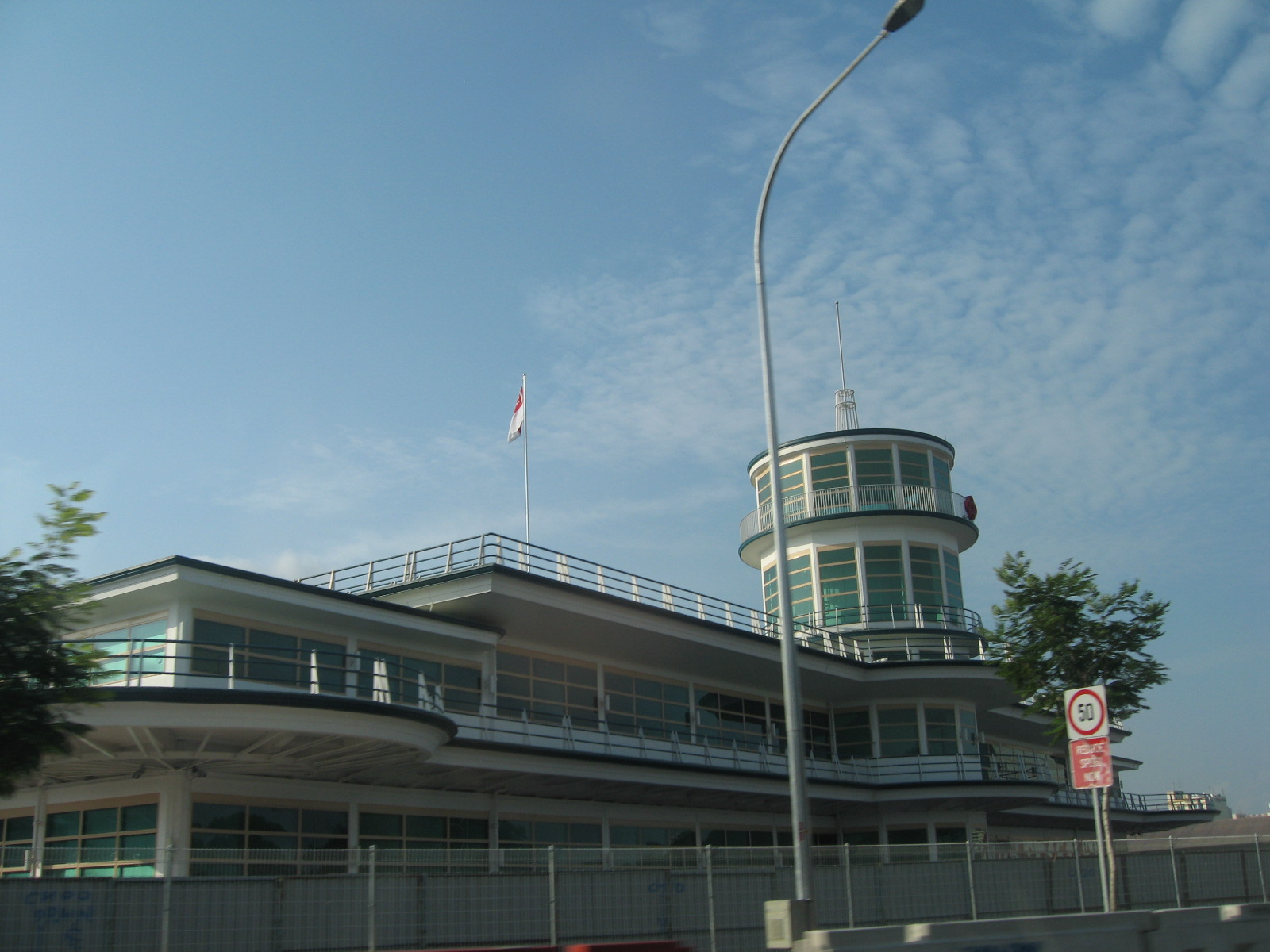
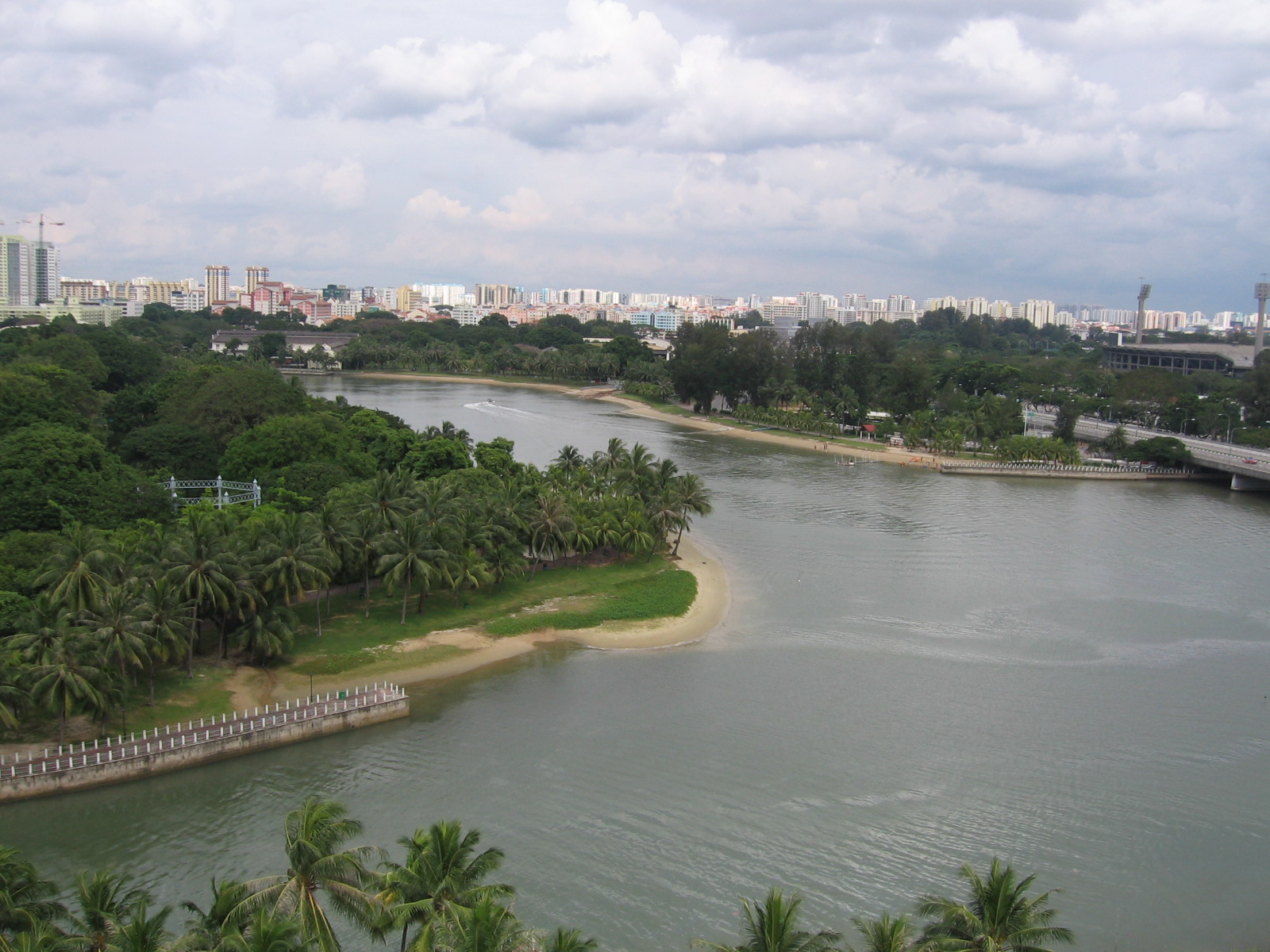
- Top: The conserved terminal building of the former Kallang Airport; Bottom: Mouths of the Kallang River and Rochor River
- Interactive map of Kampong Bugis
- Coordinates: 1.308°N 103.871°E
- Country: Singapore
- Region: Central Region
- Planning Area: Kallang

Kampong Bugis (Malay: Kampung Bugis, Chinese: 甘榜武吉士; pinyin: Gān Bǎng Wǔ Jí Shì, Tamil: கம்போங் பூகிஸ்) is a subzone within the planning area of Kallang, Singapore, as defined by the Urban Redevelopment Authority (URA). This subzone is bounded by Kallang Road and Sims Avenue in the north; the Kallang–Paya Lebar Expressway (KPE) and Sims Way in the east; Nicoll Highway in the south; and Crawford Street in the west.

Kampong Bugis is probably best known for being the location of the former Kallang Gasworks, the conserved Kallang Airport complex, as well as the former Gay World Amusement Park. A plot of land bounded by Kallang Road, the Kallang River and Rochor River is slated for future residential development, part of a pilot programme to create a car-lite riverside community. Other notable places in Kampong Bugis include Kallang Riverside Park, Merdeka Bridge and Lorong 1 Geylang Bus Terminal.

== Etymology ==
This subzone took its name from a similarly named road located within its boundary. The road itself derived its name from an expunged Buginese settlement that once sat on the mouth of the Kallang River.

== History ==
The Buginese people came from Sulawesi, in modern-day Indonesia, and exercised control over islands in the Riau Archipelago. In 1819, a Buginese leader had a conflict with the Dutch colonist and was subsequently executed. The Buginese people rebelled against the Dutch in the wake of the execution, but was met fiercely with Dutch military action. The group fled to Singapore, first settling temporarily near present-day Raffles Hotel, later moving to where Bugis Street is, before finally building a large settlement by the Kallang River in today's Kampong Bugis (literally "Bugis Village"). In the early 1950s, a major fire destroyed the Buginese village.
