= Kallang Riverside Park =

Park in Kallang, Singapore

- Interactive map of Kallang Riverside Park
- Location: Kallang, Singapore
- Coordinates: 1.3070°N 103.8660°E
- Area: 7 hectares (17 acres)
- Manager: National Parks Board
- Status: Open

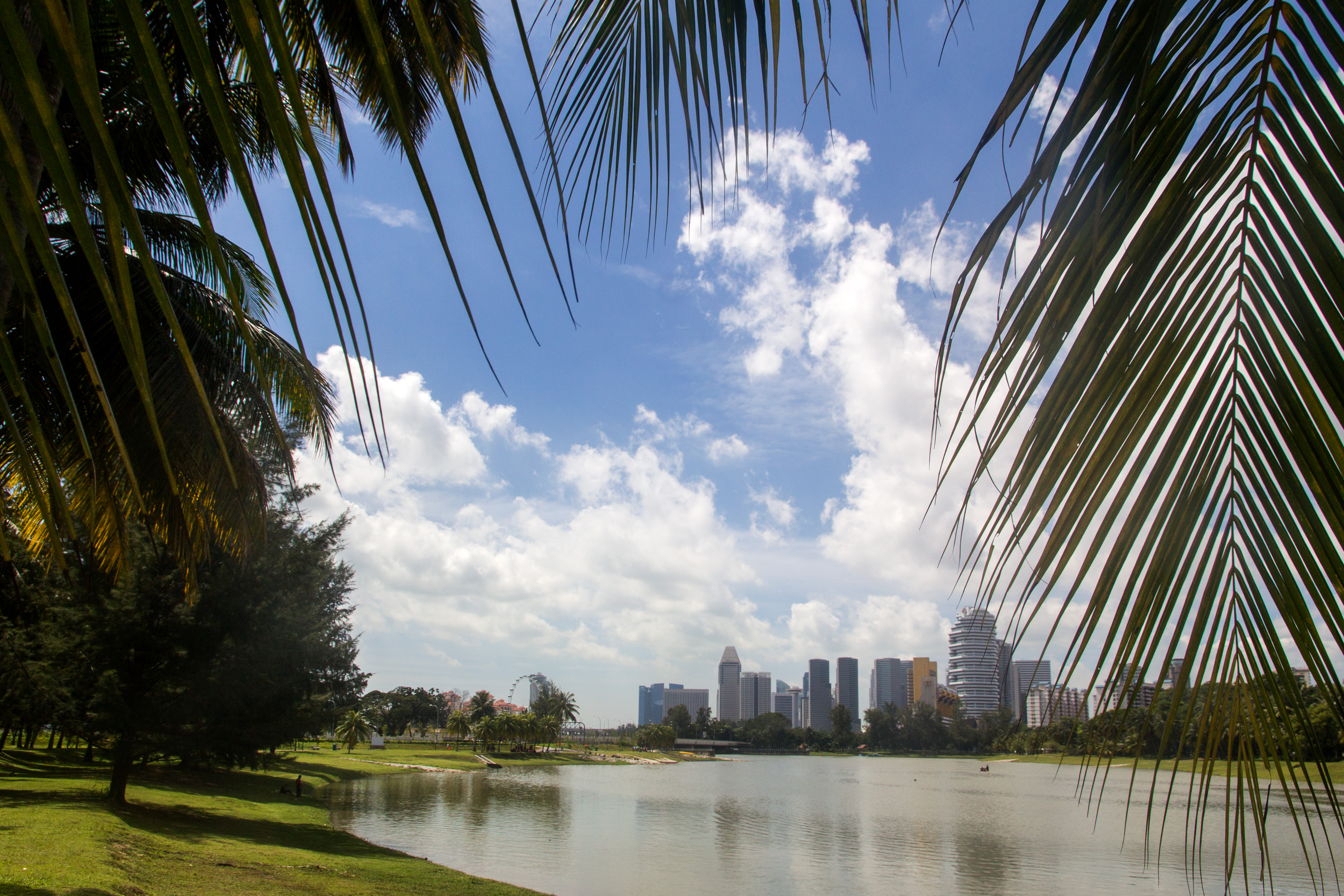
Kallang Riverside Park along the Kallang River, looking towards the Central Area.

Kallang Riverside Park (Chinese: 加冷河畔公园) is a riverine park in Kallang, Singapore. It sits on the confluence of the Kallang River and Rochor River, north of the Kallang Basin.

== Elaboration ==
The 7-hectare park is a popular water sports site in Singapore. A stretch of beach within the park is a popular location for picnics. Facilities for exercising include fitness equipment and jogging-cum-cycling tracks.

The park is a 5-minute walk from Lavender MRT station, a 10-minute walk from Kallang MRT station, and a 15-minute walk from either Stadium MRT station or Nicoll Highway MRT station. Bus stops along Kallang Road and Crawford Street are within walking distance of the park. A public car park is situated at the end of Kampong Bugis.

The eastern section of the Kallang Riverside Park (on the eastern bank of the Kallang River) is not directly connected to other parts of the park; park users can access other parts via the pedestrian path on Sir Arthur's Bridge along Geylang Road. The central section of the park (on the western bank of the Kallang River) is linked to the western section of the park (on the western bank of the Rochor River) by a pedestrian bridge; the latter is linked directly to the Marina Promenade and Marina Centre.

== History ==
The founder of modern Singapore, Stamford Raffles, could have originally landed on Singapore in the Kallang Riverside Park, instead of the Raffles' Landing Site on the Singapore River. Based on the Cho Clan Archives, Raffles ordered his ship's carpenter, Chow Ah Chi, to lead the way in posting the British East India Company flag on mainland Singapore and he supposedly landed at the mouth of the Rochor River in Kallang. Raffles, following the route taken by Chow, also arrived at the Kallang Basin in what is today's Kallang Riverside Park.

On June 15, 2005, one of the major and brutal cases in Singapore known as the Kallang River body parts murder took place here.

== See also ==
- List of parks in Singapore
