= Kallang Road =

Name transcription(s)
  - Chinese: 加冷路
- Country: Singapore

Kallang Road (Chinese: 加冷路) is a major arterial road in Kallang, Singapore. It links Sims Avenue and Geylang Road at Sir Arthur's Bridge in the east over the Kallang River to Victoria Street at Victoria Bridge across the Rochor River in the west. It began construction in 1831.

Landmarks along Kallang Road include the Kallang Riverside Park, the ICA Building, Lavender MRT station and the former Kallang Gasworks.

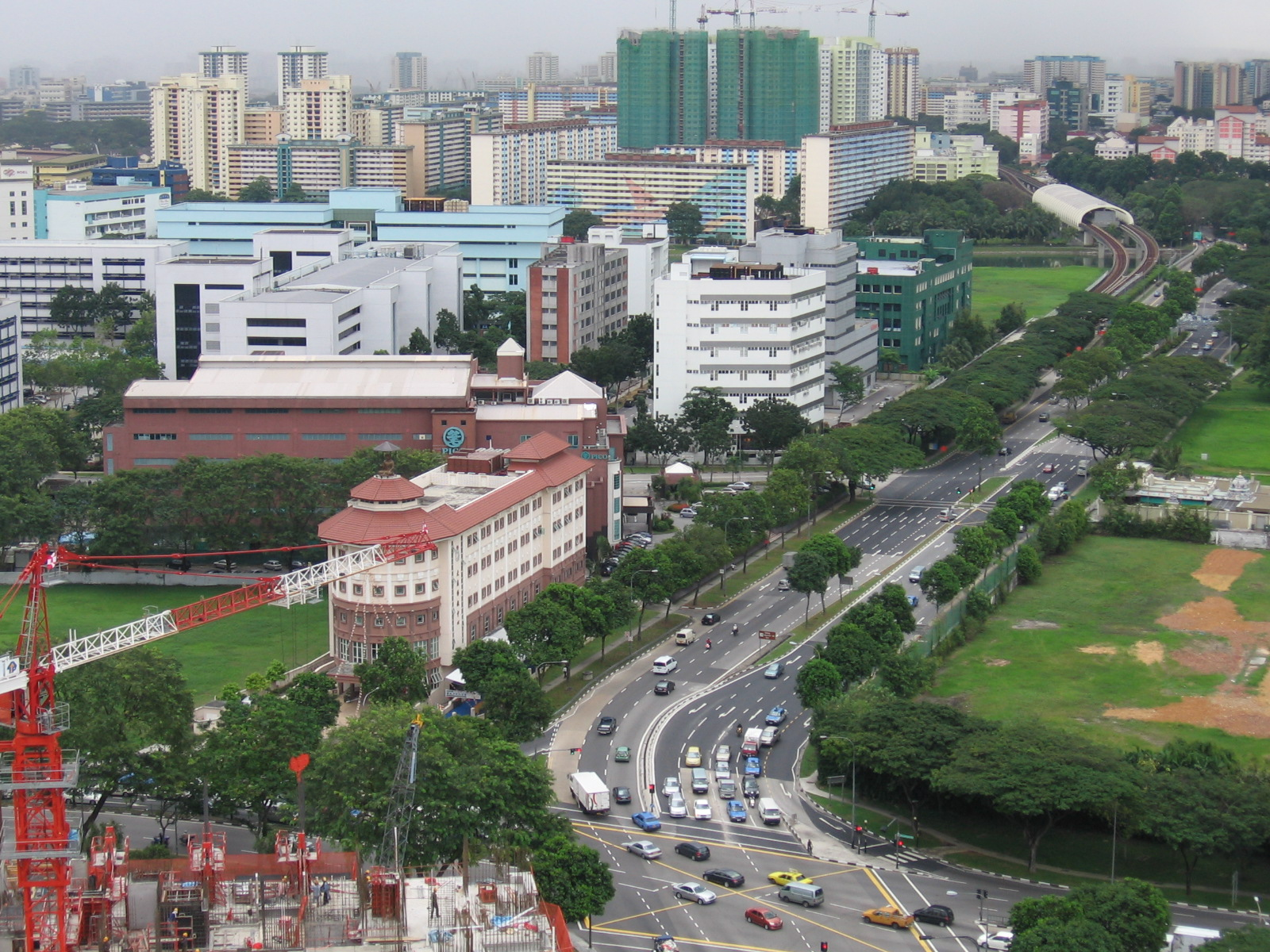
Looking east above Kallang Road towards Kallang MRT station.
