= City Energy =

- Founded: 1861; 165 years ago
- Key people: Perry Ong (CEO)

City Energy Pte Ltd, formerly known as City Gas Pte Ltd, founded as Singapore Gas Company in 1861, is the producer and retailer of piped town gas in Singapore. It is a fully owned subsidiary of Keppel Corporation.

== History ==
In 1861, the Singapore Gas Company was established in 1861 to provide piped gas to light Singapore’s streets. In the following year, the company built Kallang Gasworks, located at Kallang Basin in Kampung Bugis, which produced gas from coal. Coal from mines in Australia was shipped to the Gasworks via the Rochor and Kallang rivers.

In 1901, Singapore Gas Company was bought by the Municipal Commission.

City Energy has a production facility in Singapore, Senoko Gasworks, equipped with a capacity of 1.6 million m^{3} per day. This is the sole facility producing town gas in Singapore. City Energy uses the gas pipeline network owned by PowerGas, a subsidiary of SP Group, to supply town gas to its customers.

City Gas was renamed as City Energy on 1 December 2021.

As of 2021, City Energy has approximately 870,000 residential, commercial and industrial customers in Singapore. City Energy provides town gas pipe installation and town gas supply activation services. The maintenance and retail of gas appliances and solutions are also services offered by the company.

== See also ==
- Energy in Singapore
