= Lavender, Singapore =

Coordinates: 1.2984°N 103.8564°E

Lavender
- Subzone of Kallang Planning Area

Other transcription(s)
  - Chinese: 劳明达
  - Malay: Lavender
  - Tamil: லவண்டர்
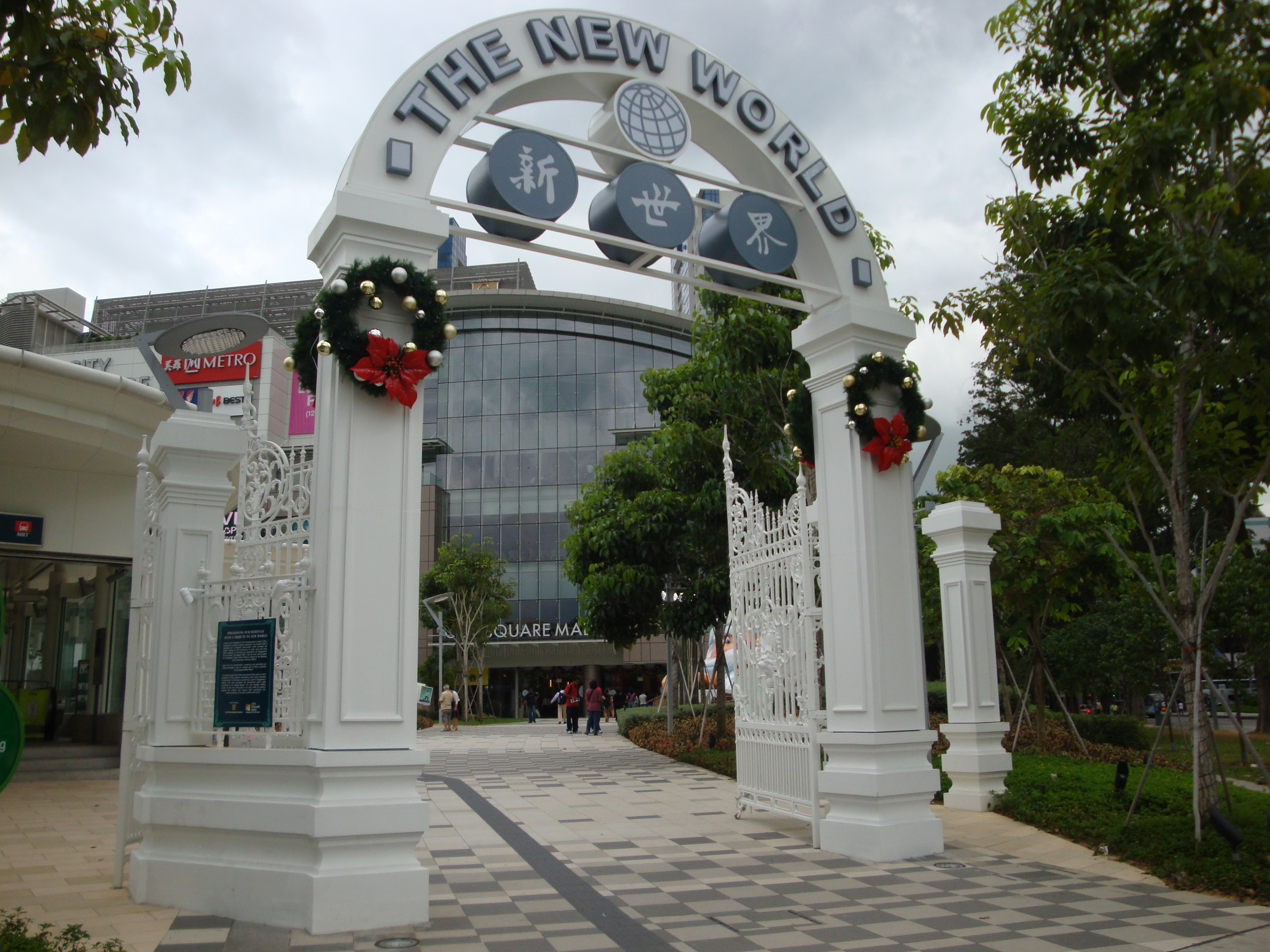
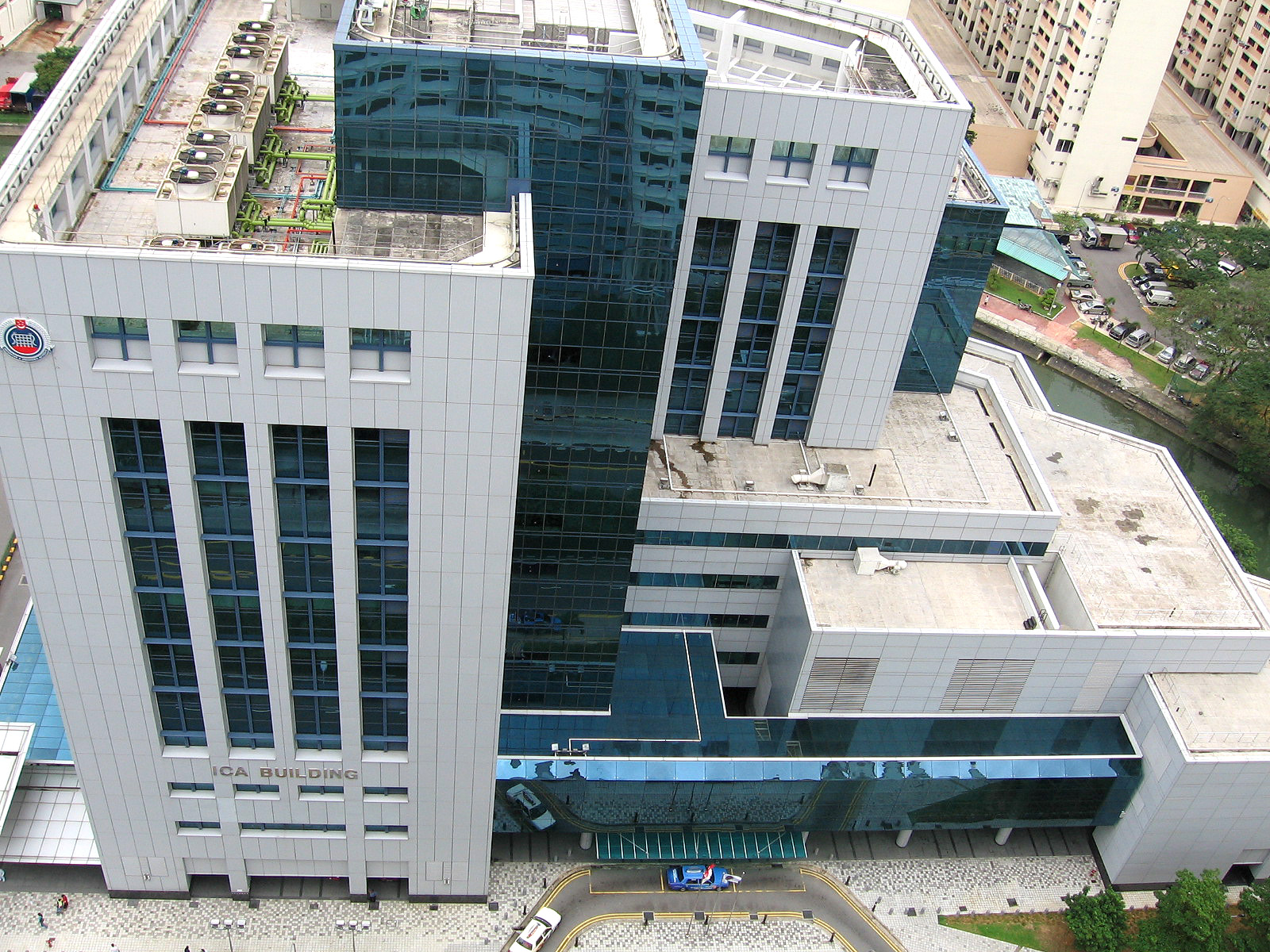
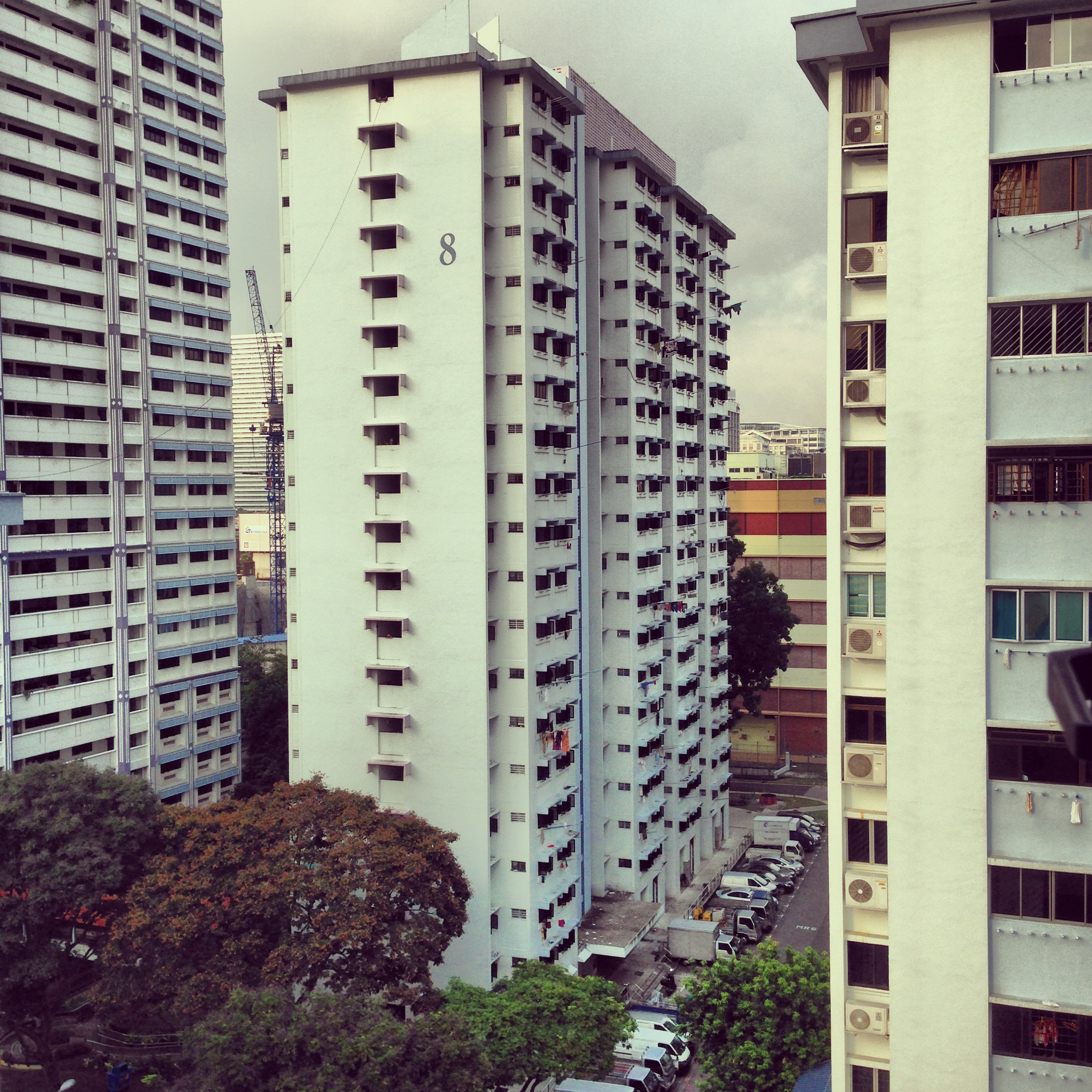
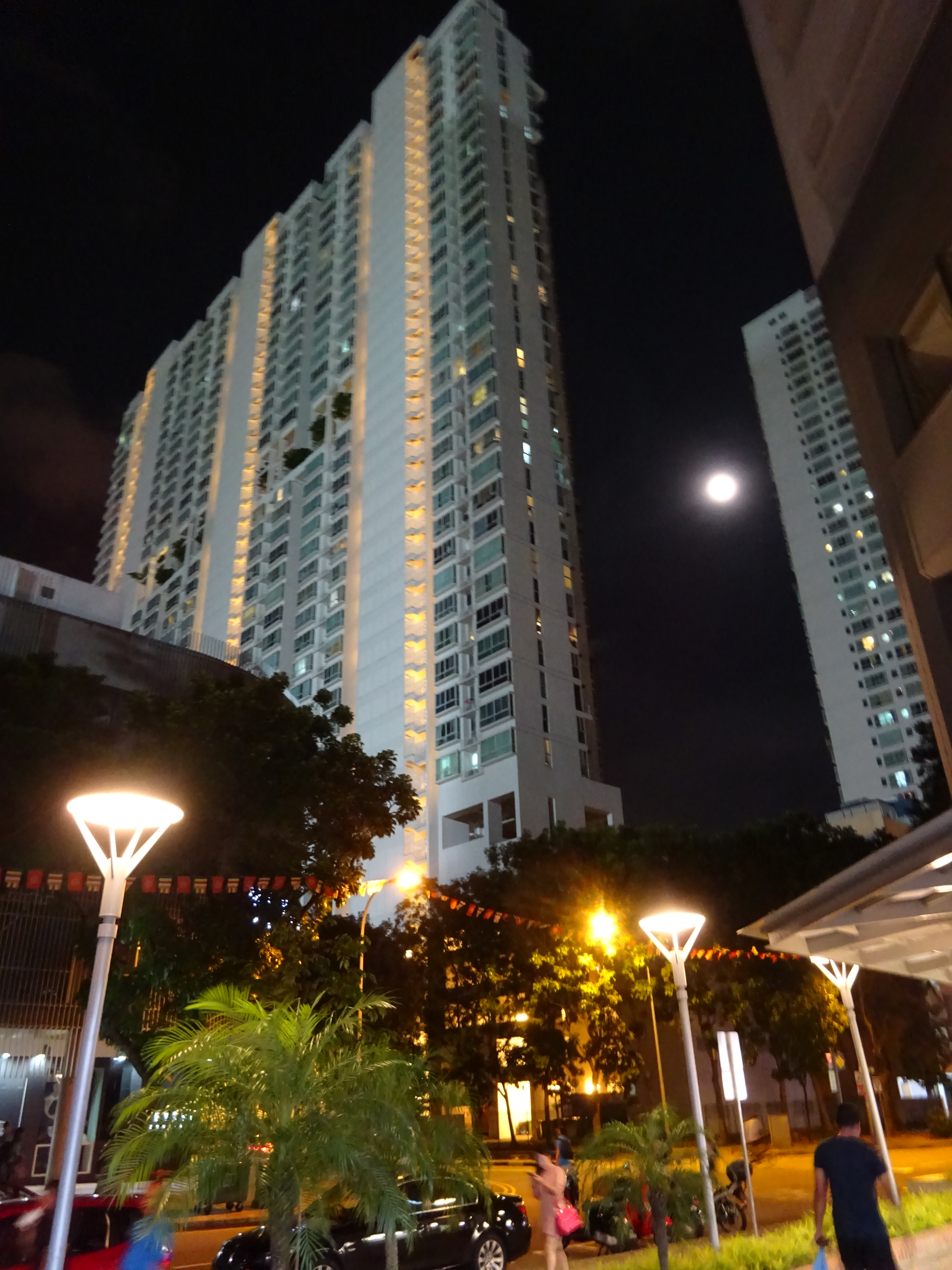
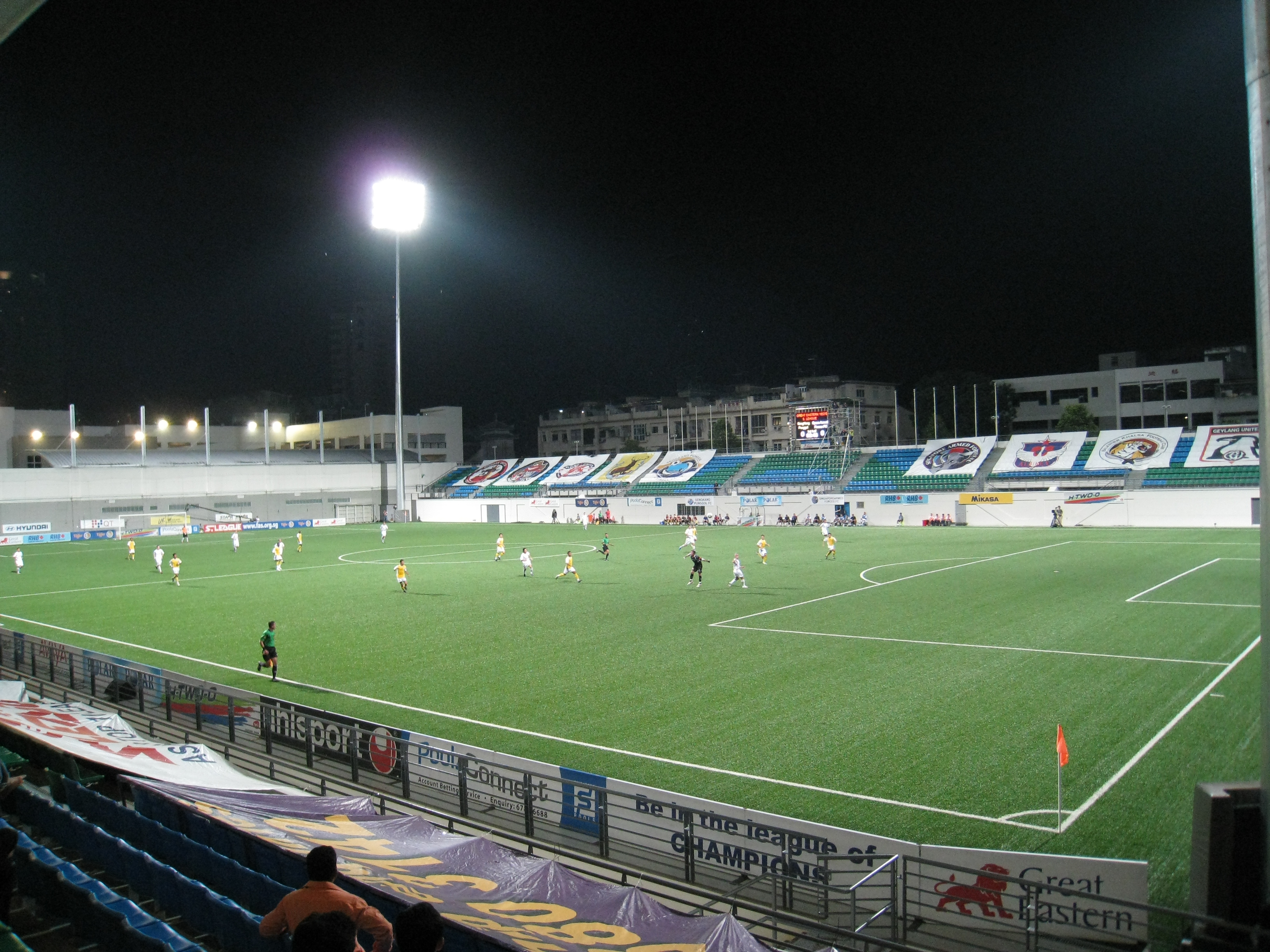
- Row 1: Gate of the old New World Amusement Park with City Square Mall in the background Row 2: Immigration and Checkpoints Authority (ICA) Building; Row 3, left: Housing and Development Board (HDB) flats along King's George's Avenue; Row 3, right: Citylights condominiums Row 4: Jalan Besar Stadium
- Interactive map of Lavender
- Country: Singapore
- Region: Central Region
- Planning Area: Kallang

Lavender is a subzone within the planning area of Kallang, Singapore, as defined by the Urban Redevelopment Authority (URA). Lavender is composed of an area bounded by Tessensohn Road in the north; Balestier Road, Lavender Street and Crawford Street in the east; the Rochor River and Rochor Canal in the south; as well as Syed Alwi Road, Serangoon Road and Rangoon Road in the west.

Lavender is largely commercial, even though several blocks of public housing provided by the Housing and Development Board (HDB) exist at Jellicoe Road and French Road. Notable places in this subzone include Jalan Besar Stadium, Jalan Besar Swimming Complex, Jalan Besar Community Club, the series of historic shophouses along Jalan Besar, the headquarters of People's Association, Immigration and Checkpoints Authority (ICA) Building, Tai Pei Buddhist Centre, Sri Srinivasa Perumal Temple, Mustafa Centre, Umar Pulavar Tamil Language Centre and City Square Mall. In addition, the New World Amusement Park once stood in this area.

The district has not changed a lot in a city known for its frenetic urban planning, and as a source puts it, "entering Lavender is like entering Singapore in the late 1980s", where old public housing is occupied by an elderly community, with small automotive shops, hardware resellers and temples.

A trend of gentrification began in around 2014, mainly along Jalan Besar. Parts of the Little India ethnic neighbourhood extends into this area. There are now many small coffee shops and music studios in this rather vintage-looking district.

Lavender MRT station and Farrer Park MRT station serve Lavender subzone.

== Etymology ==
The subzone of Lavender derived its name from Lavender Street. The road was officially named on 8 March 1858, as a result of suggestions by the nearby residents. Contrary to what the name may suggest, the area around Lavender Street was foul-smelling, probably due to either the Kallang Gasworks in the vicinity, or the use of nightsoil as fertilizer at nearby farms. The name was suggested by residents of the area as tongue-in-cheek humour.

== Notable locations ==
- 161 Lavender Street
