= Lavender MRT station =

Mass Rapid Transit station in Singapore

Lavender EW11 劳明达 லவண்டர்
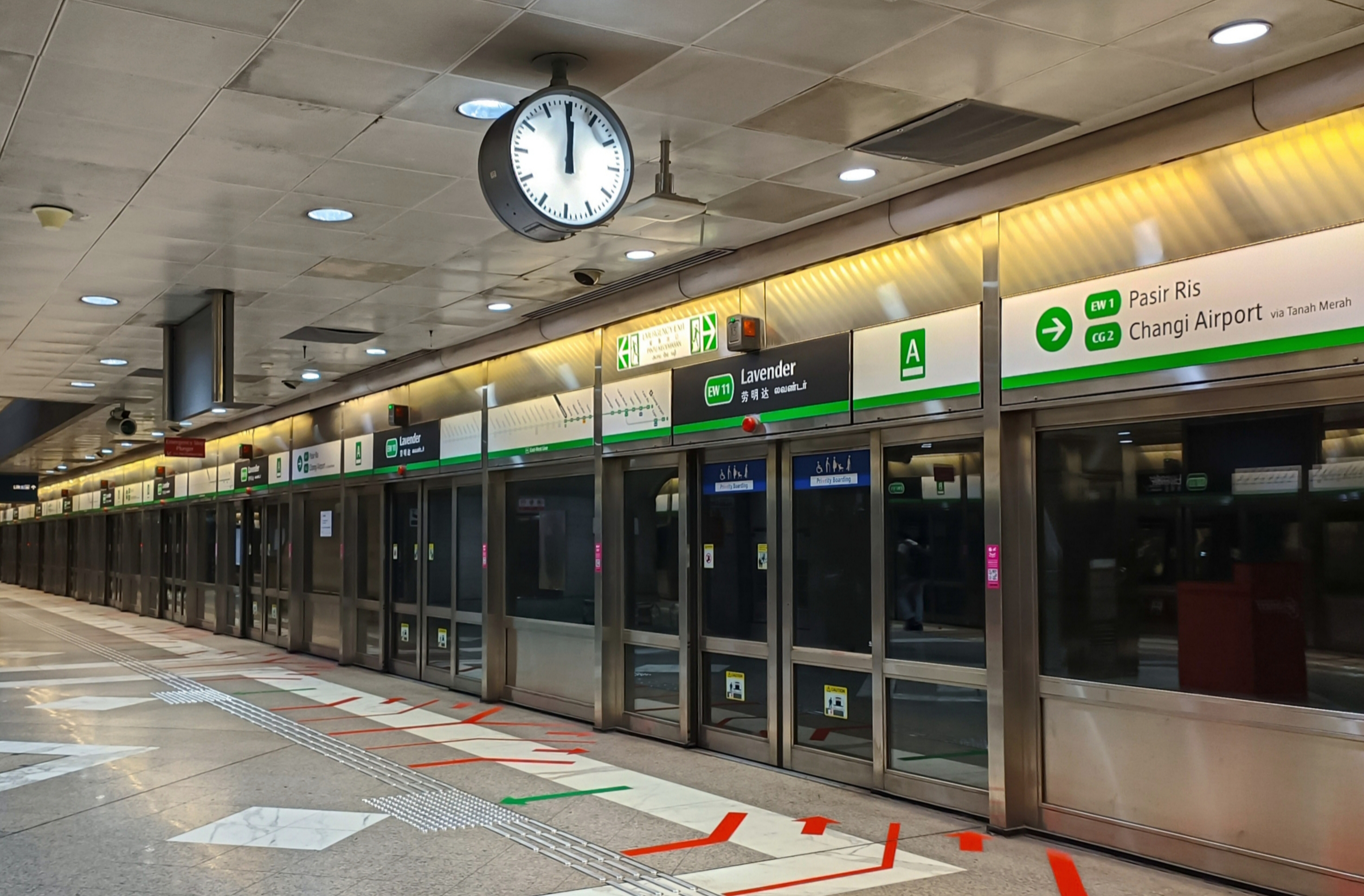
- Platform A of Lavender MRT station

General information
- Location: 50 Kallang Road; Singapore 208699
- Coordinates: 1°18′25.80″N 103°51′46.83″E
- System: Mass Rapid Transit (MRT) station
- Operator: SMRT Trains
- Line: East–West Line
- Platforms: 2 (1 island platform)
- Tracks: 2
- Connections: Bus, Taxi

Construction
- Structure type: Underground
- Platform levels: 1
- Parking: Yes (ICA Building)
- Cycle facilities: Yes
- Accessible: Yes

History
- Opened: 4 November 1989; 37 years ago
- Former names: Kallang, Crawford

Passengers
- June 2024: 16,402 per day

Services
Preceding station	Mass Rapid Transit	Following station
Kallang towards Pasir Ris	East–West Line	Bugis towards Tuas Link
Track layout
Location
- Location within Singapore Rail central area

Lavender MRT station is an underground Mass Rapid Transit (MRT) station on the East–West Line in Kallang, Singapore. Located under Kallang Road, the station is close to the Immigration and Checkpoints Authority (ICA) Building and Jalan Besar stadium. Planned and built as part of Phase Two of the initial system, the contract for the station's construction was awarded in October 1985, and it was opened in November 1989.

== History ==
Lavender station was first included in the early plans of the MRT system as Crawford station in May 1982, with its designation as a bomb shelter announced as early as February 1983 along with six other stations. It was later announced to be part of Phase II of the MRT in October 1983. In September 1984, the station's name was changed to Lavender station.

Several joint ventures between companies were prequalified for Contract 301B by May 1985, which detailed the construction of the construction of Lavender station, as well as for Victoria station and the tunnels between Bras Basah Road and the Kallang River. Ultimately, Contract 301B was awarded to Nishimatsu-Lum Chang Joint Venture for S$227 million (1985) (US$103.17 million) in October 1985.

External Image
- Construction of Lavender station Source: The Straits Times

Initially, the tunnels between Victoria and Lavender station in Victoria street were going to be digged using the cut-and-cover method due to the soft marine clay present, which would have resulted in road diversions and shophouses being covered by hoardings. However, the contractors suggested the tunnels be bored underground, which was accepted by the MRTC, though a shield chamber would have to be built underneath the Tai-Pan Hotel for the tunnelling machine.

As for the tunnel at the Kallang Road and Crawford and Lavender Streets junction, the MRTC considered boring the tunnels but had to use the cut-and-cover method due to the marine clay and sand being too soft and loose. When tunneling, precautions had to be made for the 885m long tunnel. Even though there was not much difficulty when tunneling through Robinson Road, tunneling through Kallang Road and Victoria Street was challenging as it has old shophouses, which had weaker foundations compared to the buildings at Robinson Road and therefore had to be carefully monitored. In March 1986, the section of Kallang Road between Rochor Canal Road and Lavender Street had to be diverted southwards to facilitate the construction of the station. Also, the junction the stretch of Kallang Road between Lavender Street and Rochor Canal Road was closed to traffic. Construction for the station started around July 1986. By February 1987, tunneling between Victoria and Lavender stations was completed five months ahead of schedule. The station opened on 4 November 1989, along with the section of the East–West Line from City Hall to Tanah Merah.

== Station details ==
Lavender station is located under Kallang Road, and is close to the ICA Building and Jalan Besar Stadium. Served by the East–West Line, between Kallang and Bugis stations, the station has the station code EW11. When it opened, it had the station code of E2 before being changed to its current station code in August 2001 as a part of a system-wide campaign to cater to the expanding MRT System. As one of the nine stations on the original MRT network built as emergency bomb shelters, the station was fitted out with steel blast doors and 2 metres (6.6 ft) thick walls of reinforced concrete.

Lavender is named after the subzone it serves, which possibly originated as a tongue-in-cheek to the then nearby Kallang Gasworks emitting a foul smell or from the night soil used as fertiliser. The station is directly parallel to Kallang Road and bounded by Crawford Street and the Rochor River. It has two exits primarily serving landmarks in the area such as the ICA building, Jalan Besar Community Club, and Kitchener Complex.

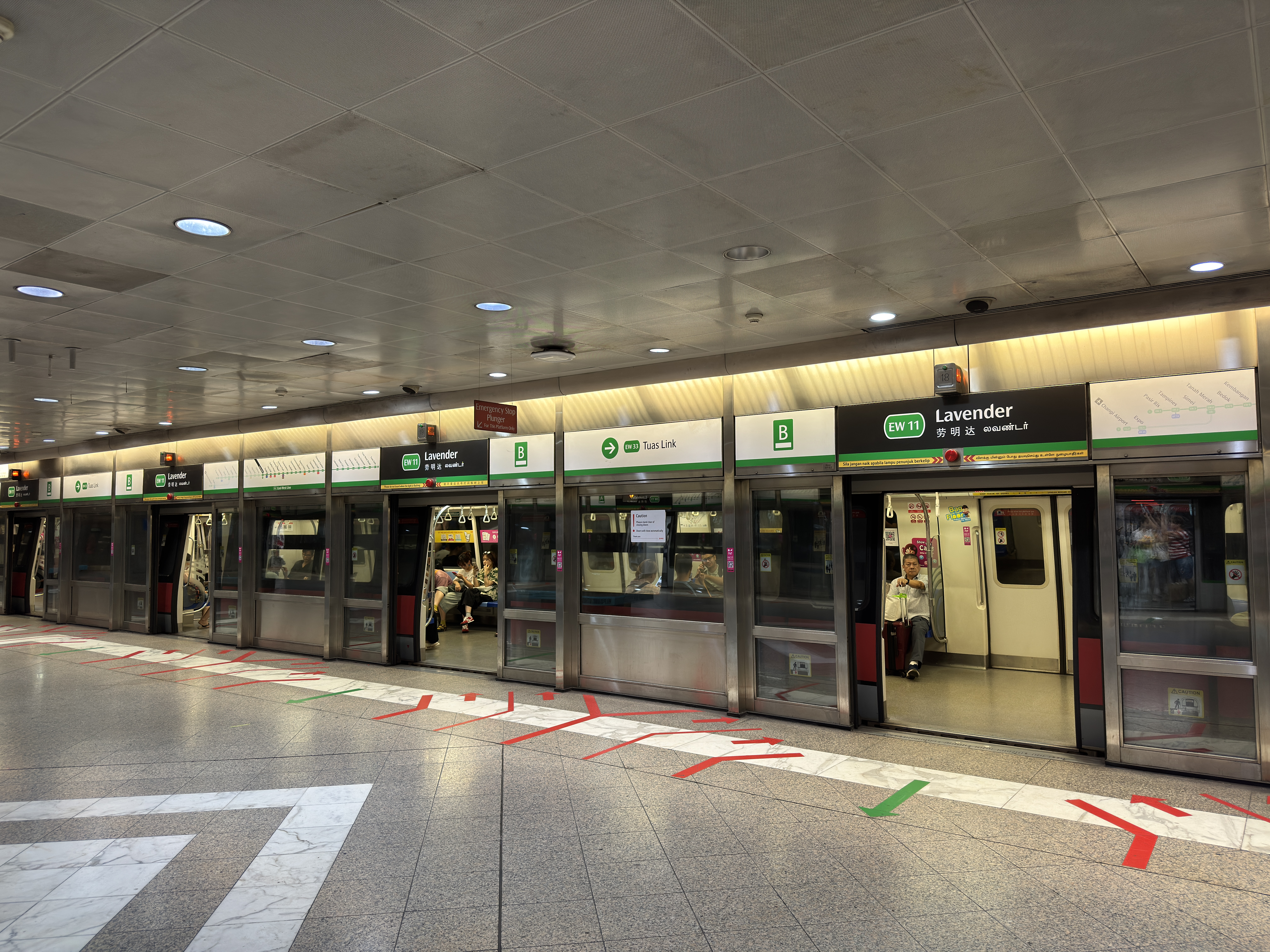
Platform B
