= Geylang Road =

Trunk road in East Singapore linked to the central district

Coordinates: 1°18′46″N 103°52′48″E

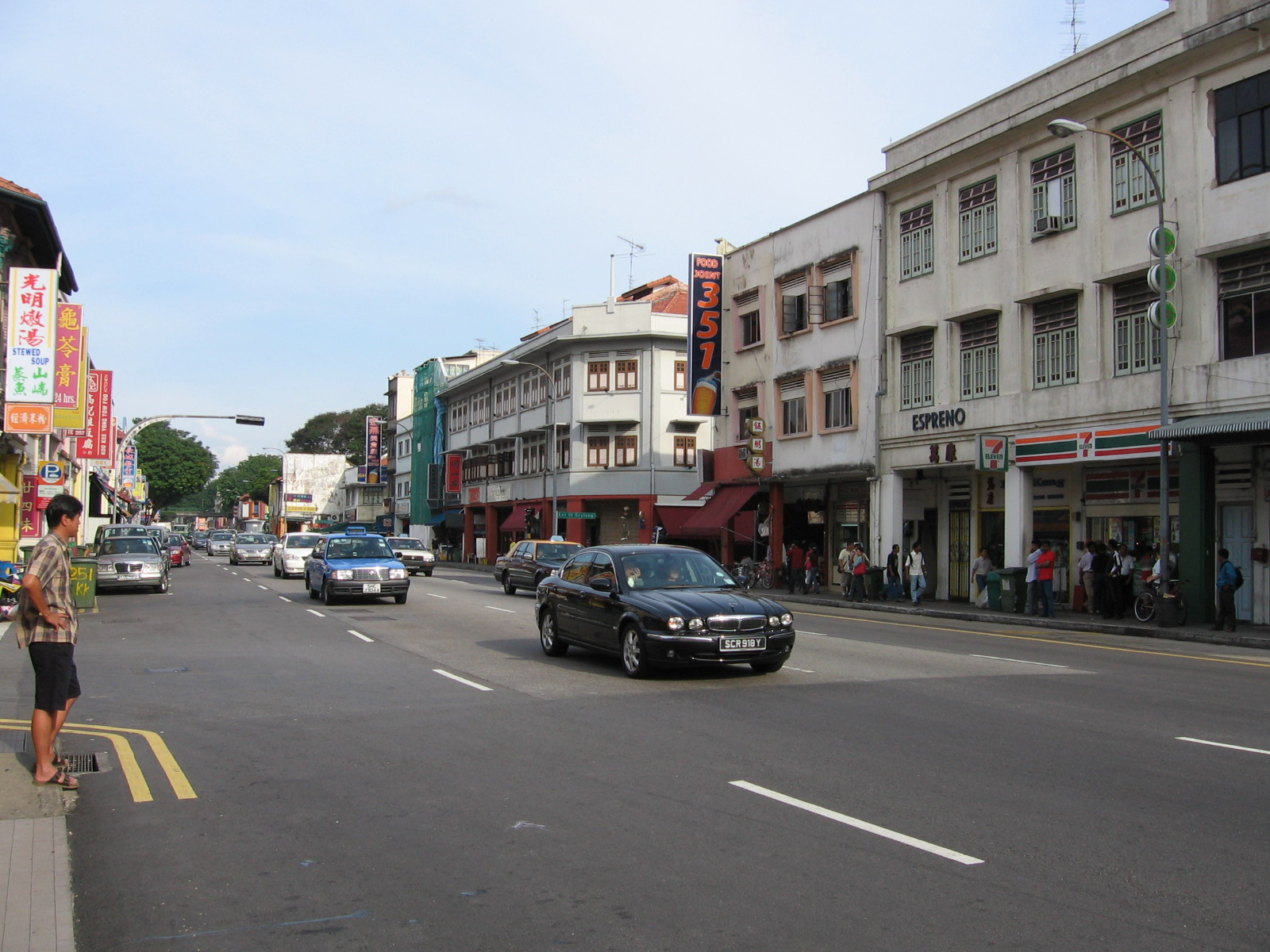
Geylang Road

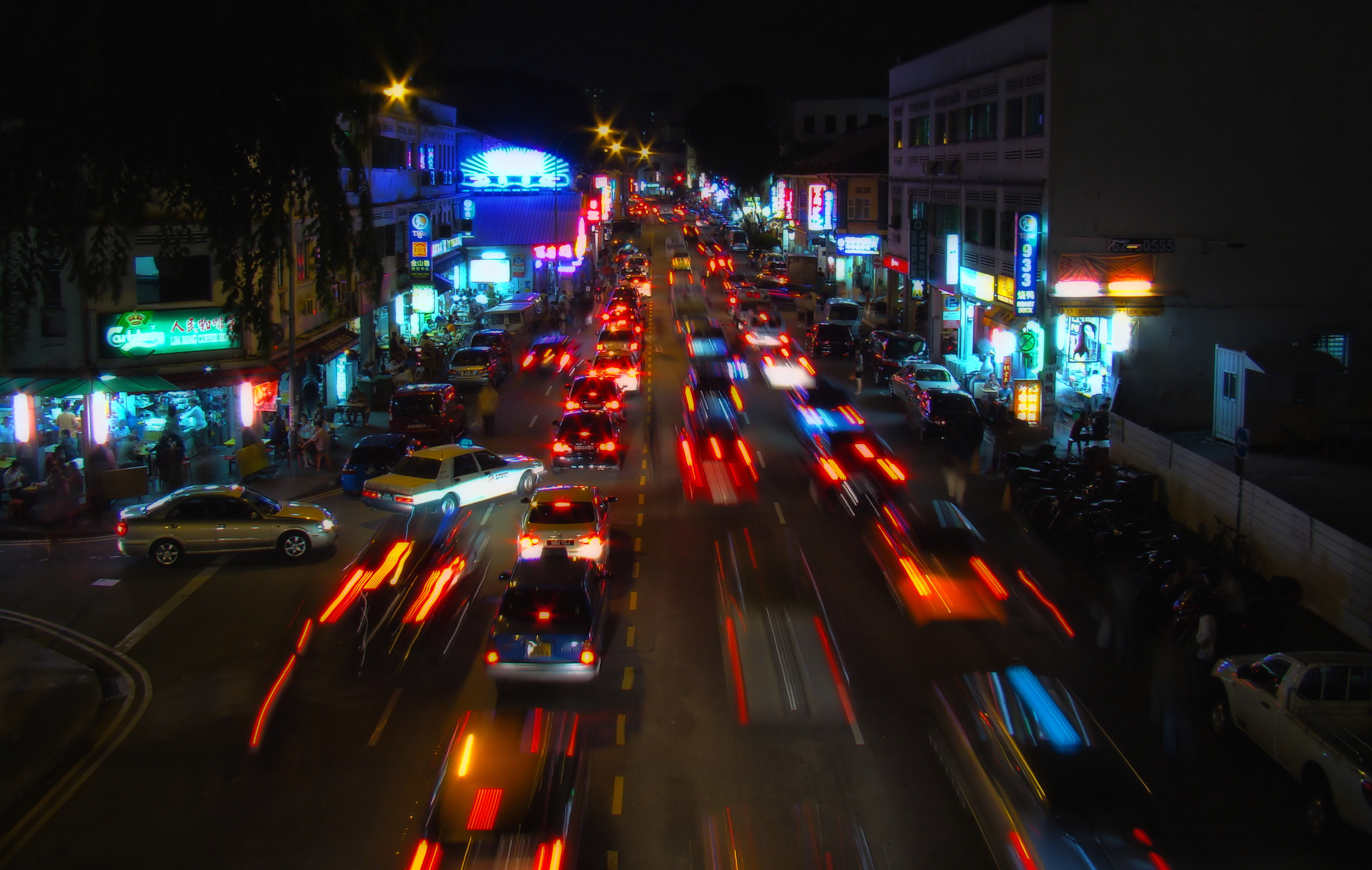
Geylang Road by night in 2008

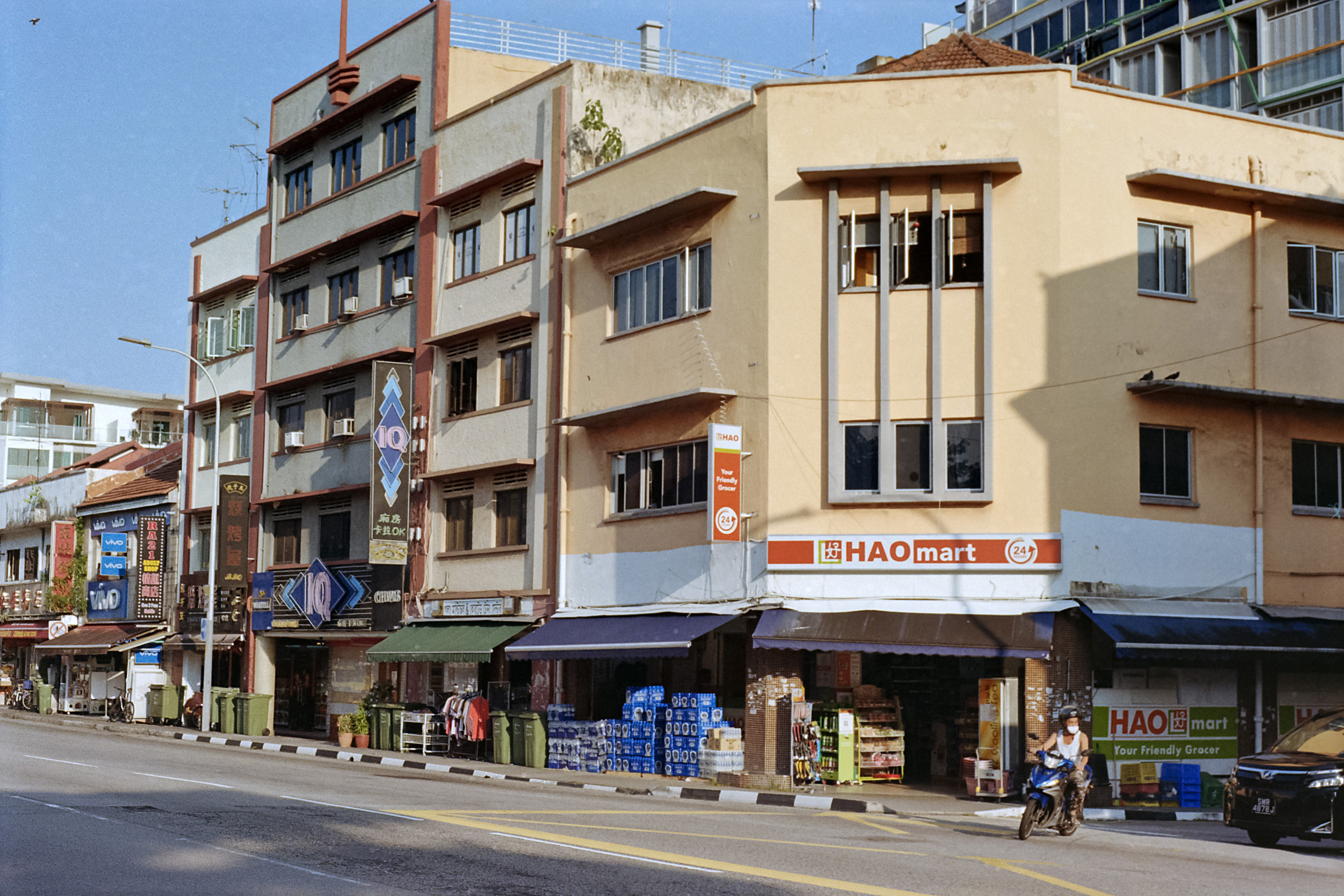
View of Geylang Road, 2021.

Geylang Road (Chinese: 芽笼路) is a major trunk road linking Singapore's eastern suburban areas with the country's central business district. Deriving its name from the area of Geylang, which the road cuts through, it is fronted on both sides by low-rise shophouses protected statutorily from urban redevelopment in keeping with its history and urban heritage.

The road itself begins at the east where it meets Changi Road at the junction with Geylang Serai and Joo Chiat Road and continues westward until Kallang Road over the Kallang River at Sir Arthur's Bridge. Previously it was the only main thoroughfare linking Changi and Kallang, the former being the location of the Changi Airport while the latter was home to Singapore's first purpose-built civil airport, the Kallang Airport. As traffic mushroomed, Geylang Road was converted into a one-way street, and a parallel road, Sims Avenue, was constructed to the north to cater for traffic in the opposite direction.

== See also ==
- Transport in Singapore
