= Raffles's Landing Site =

Historical site in Singapore

Coordinates: 1°17′16″N 103°51′2″E

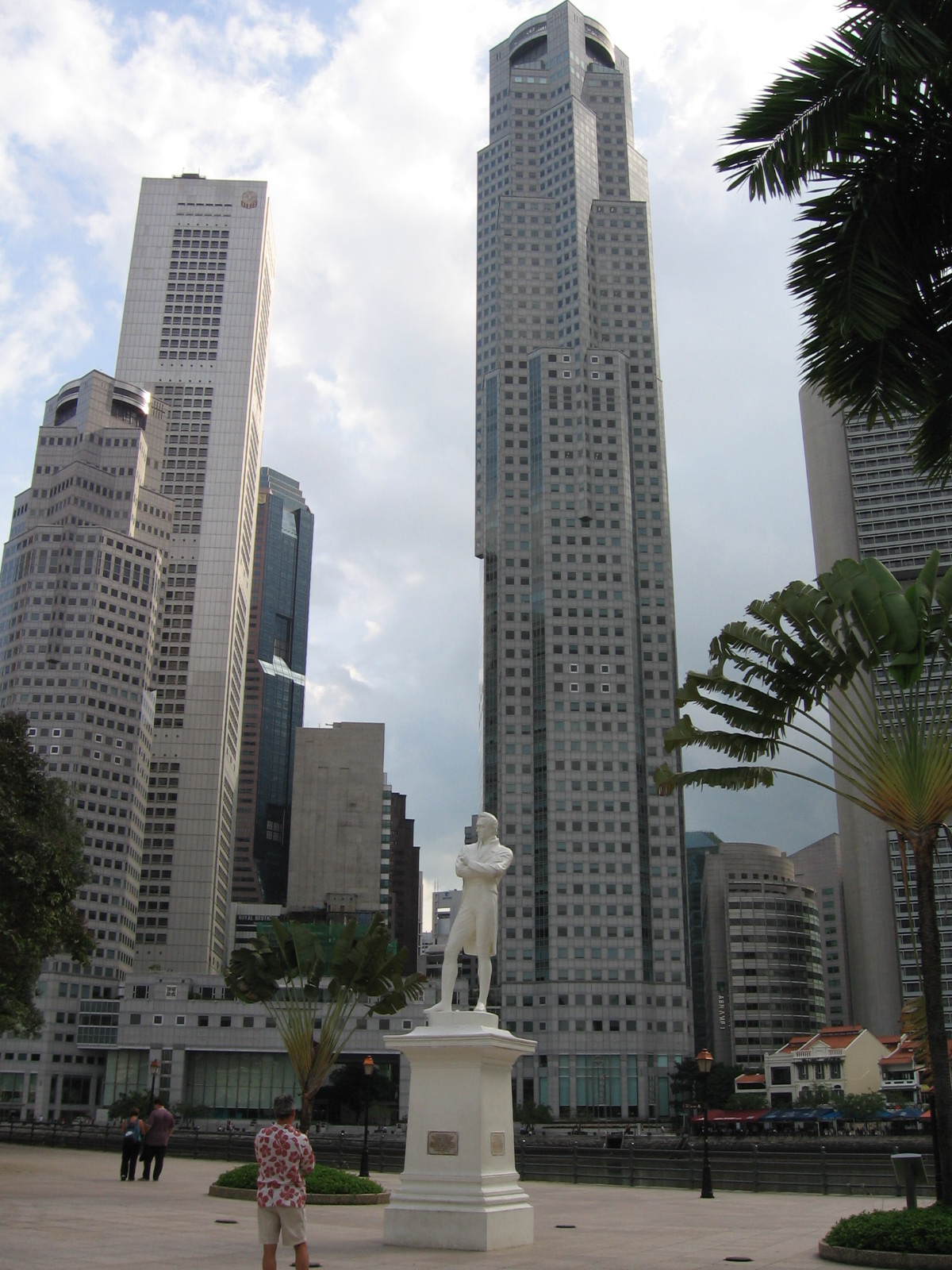
The office towers at Raffles Place on the south bank of the Singapore River serve as a backdrop against Sir Stamford Raffles's statue located at Raffles' Landing Site on the river's opposite bank.

Raffles's Landing Site is the location where tradition holds that Sir Stamford Raffles landed in on 28 January 1819. The site is located at Boat Quay within the Civic District, in the Downtown Core of the Central Area, Singapore's central business district.

== History ==
On 28 January 1819, Sir Stamford Raffles landed at this site for his first visit, which lasted ten days. During this period, with the help of Major William Farquhar, he concluded the first treaty with the local rulers Temenggong Abdul Rahman and Sultan Hussein Shah.

The site is denoted by a statue of Sir Stamford Raffles and is located on the north bank of the Singapore River. The present polymarble statue was unveiled in 1972. It was made from plaster casts from the original 1887 figure that currently stands opposite Victoria Concert Halls.

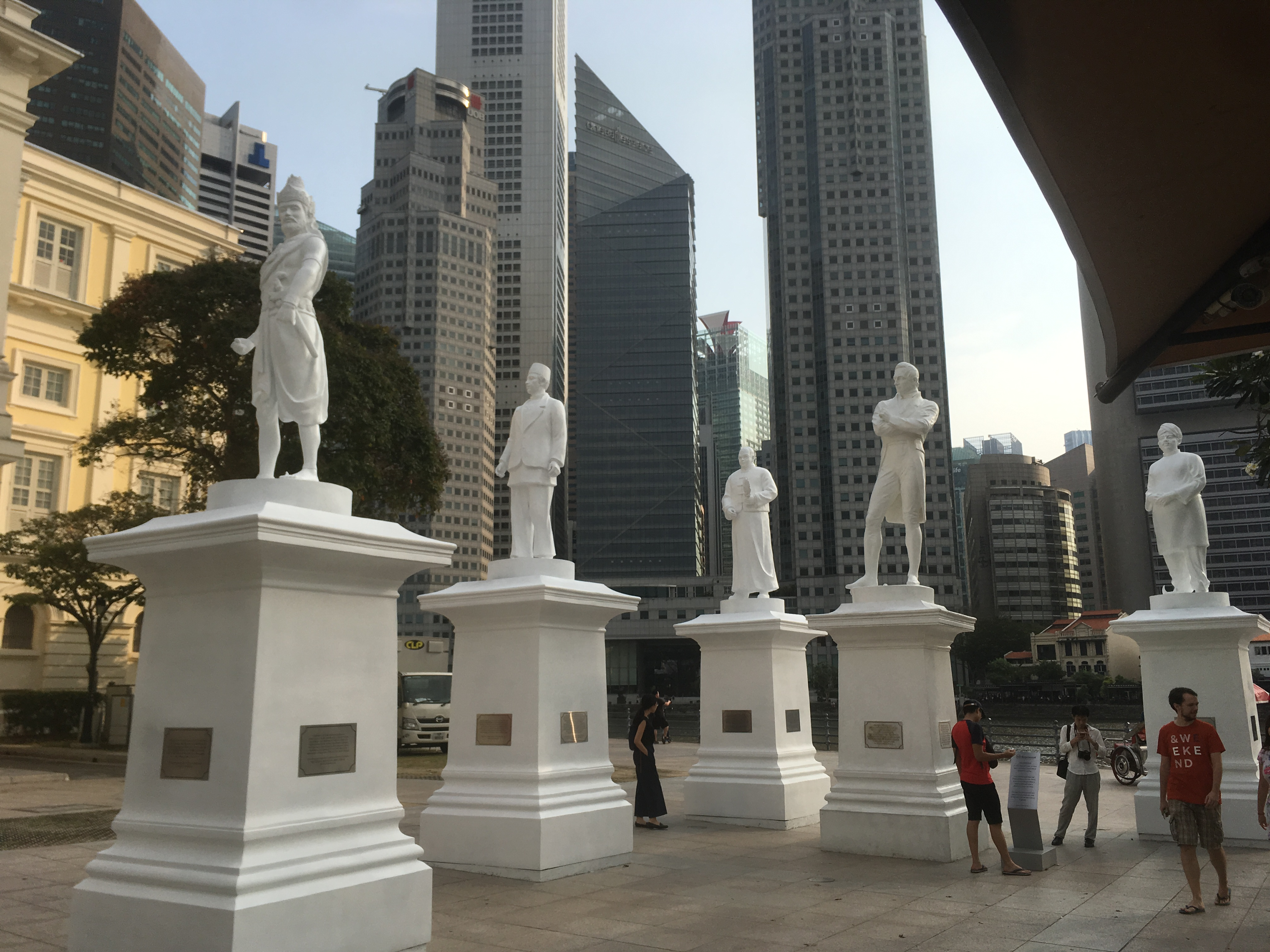
Additional statues were temporarily added to mark the bicentenary of the modern Singapore's founding.

In 2019, as part of commemorations for the bicentenary of modern's Singapore founding, numerous alterations were made to and around the statue of Raffles. Camouflage was used to make the statue blend into the backdrop of the buildings in Raffles Place on the south bank, intended "to arouse curiosity, maybe some reflection and ultimately, to spark conversations about our history." Further statues were temporarily erected of Raffles's contemporaries such as Munshi Abdullah, Tan Tock Seng, and Naraina Pillai, along with that of the founder of the Kingdom of Singapura, Sang Nila Utama.

== Plaque inscription ==
The Plaque at the landing site reads "On this historic site, Sir Thomas Stamford Raffles first landed in Singapore on 28th January 1819, and with genius and perception changed the destiny of Singapore from an obscure fishing village to a great seaport and modern metropolis."

== Dispute ==
There is a dispute as to where was the exact location that Raffles first landed in Singapore. While the north bank of the Singapore River is generally believed to be the location, there is another source that claims otherwise. Based on the Cho Clan Archives, Raffles ordered his ship's carpenter, Chow Ah Chi, to lead the way in posting the British East India Company flag on mainland Singapore and he supposedly landed at the mouth of the Rochor River in Kallang. Raffles, following the route taken by Chow, also arrived at the Kallang Basin in what is today's Kallang Riverside Park.

== See also ==
- History of Singapore
- Timeline of Singaporean history
- Stamford Raffles
