= Kallang Gasworks =

Former gas plant in Kallang, Singapore

Coordinates: 1°18′29.9″N 103°51′54.3″E

Kallang Gasworks (Chinese: 加冷煤气厂; Pinyin: Jiālěng méiqì chǎng) was the first site dedicated to gas manufacturing from coal in Singapore. It operated from 1862 to 23 March 1998.

In 1862, it was constructed by the Singapore Gas Company and occupied an area of about 3.14ha. It was built to supply piped gas in Singapore, and was the first in the country. It had a daily production capacity of 1,000,000m^{3}.

It was the largest gas works in Southeast Asia at the time. Today, the site is listed as a Historic Site by the National Heritage Board. The area is bounded by Kallang Road, Crawford Street, Kampong Bugis and the Rochor River.

At that time, gas was produced using coal and Kallang Gasworks was ideally located by the bank of the Rochor River. It made the delivery of coal supplies shipped from neighbouring countries convenient. The Kallang Basin site formed part of Singapore's southern coastline, before major land reclamation transformed the area into what it is today.

== History ==
=== Tanks ===
There were a total of four tanks used for operation at the plant.

Tanks 1 and 2 were constructed with the plant in 1862 and were used till 1957, when they were demolished.

Tank number 3 was added before 1900, and tank number 4 was the last addition. It was built between 1908 and 1909.

=== Plant operations ===
Gas production continued uninterruptedly for 137 years at the Kallang Gasworks, except for short breaks during the world wars.

The plant was initially built to supply the piped gas for the street lighting. Its original function of servicing gas lighting soon faded as electricity took over street lights in 1906.. However, piped gas continued to grow in demand despite street lighting converting to electricity. This was due to the need for gas as fuel for cooking and water heating, especially with the rapid housing developments during the period of the 1960s and 1970s.

When operations were handed over to the municipal commissioners, coal carbonising plants were installed. It happened over a few decades, from 1901 to 1930. These plants were used till 1958. when the gas works were converted to oil gasification. After the last gas street lamp disappearing in 1956, the use of fuel oil replaced coal. New oil gasification plants were installed to replace the coal carbonising plants in 1958.

In July 1997, the Kallang Gasworks piped gas production was relocated to Senoko Gasworks, which had a higher daily production capacity of 1,600,000m^{3.}

On 23 March 1998, Kallang Gasworks was officially decommissioned. Then on 26 March 1998, three days later, for the first and only time, public access to the plant was granted before it was returned to the government.

=== Management ===
- 1862 to 1901 – The Singapore Gas Company
- 1901 to 1951 – Municipal Commission
- 1951 to 1963 – Municipal Commission was renamed to City Council
- 1 May 1963 to 1 October 1995 – The Singapore Public Utilities Board was constituted and took over from the former city council.
- 1 October 1995 to 23 March 1998 – Singapore Power Pte Ltd

== Notable related events ==
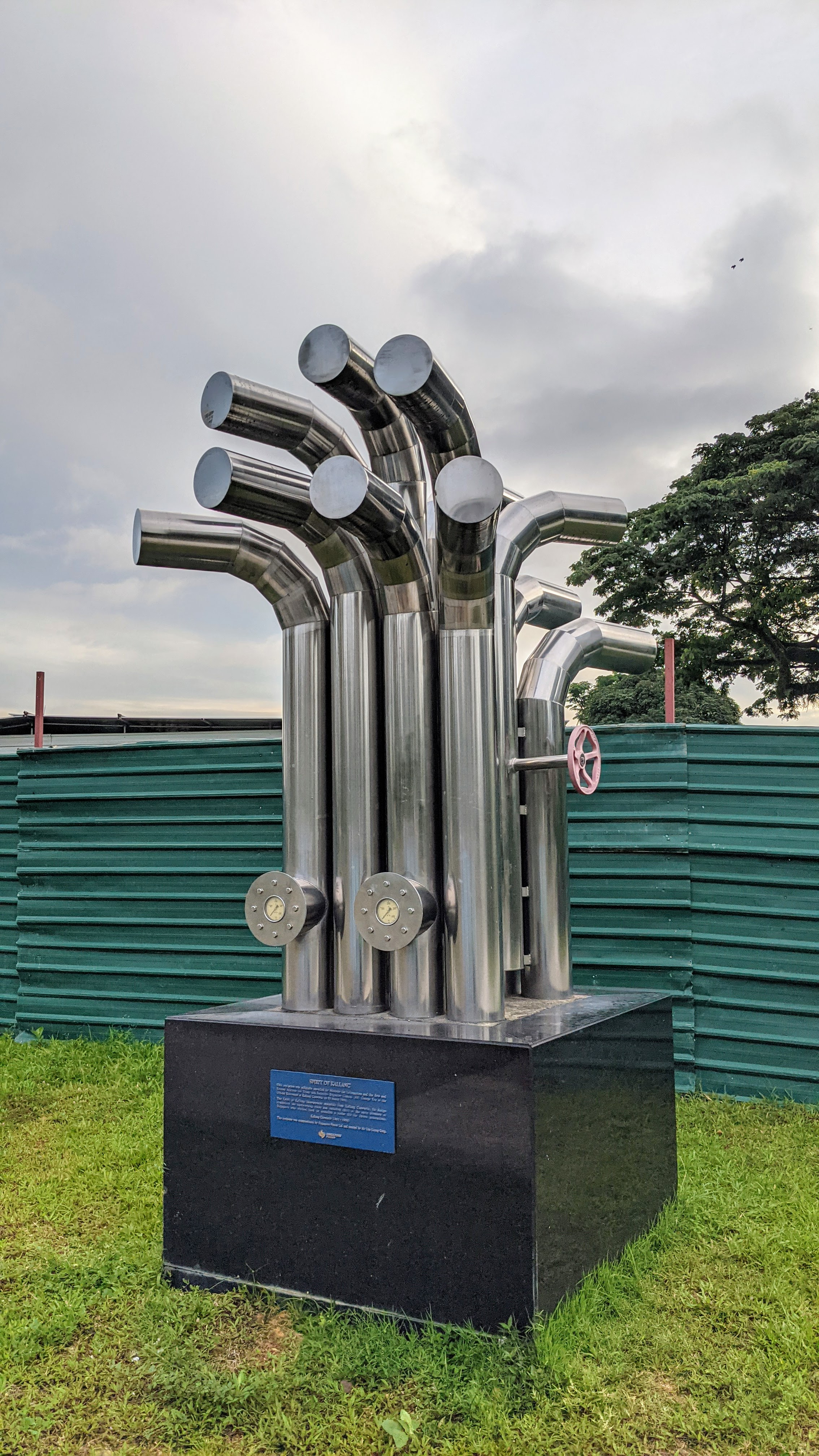
Spirit of Kallang sculpture

The infamous 1964 Singapore race riots broke out at the section of Kallang Road near the Kallang Gasworks.

Plans to develop the Kallang Riverside area led to official announcement in January 1987 that the Kallang Gasworks was to be demolished.

A sculpture titled Spirit of Kallang by artist Lim Leong Seng is standing within Kallang Riverside Park to commemorate the Kallang Gasworks. The sculpture made use of materials formerly from the Kallang Gasworks.
