= Statue of Stamford Raffles =

Sculpture in Singapore

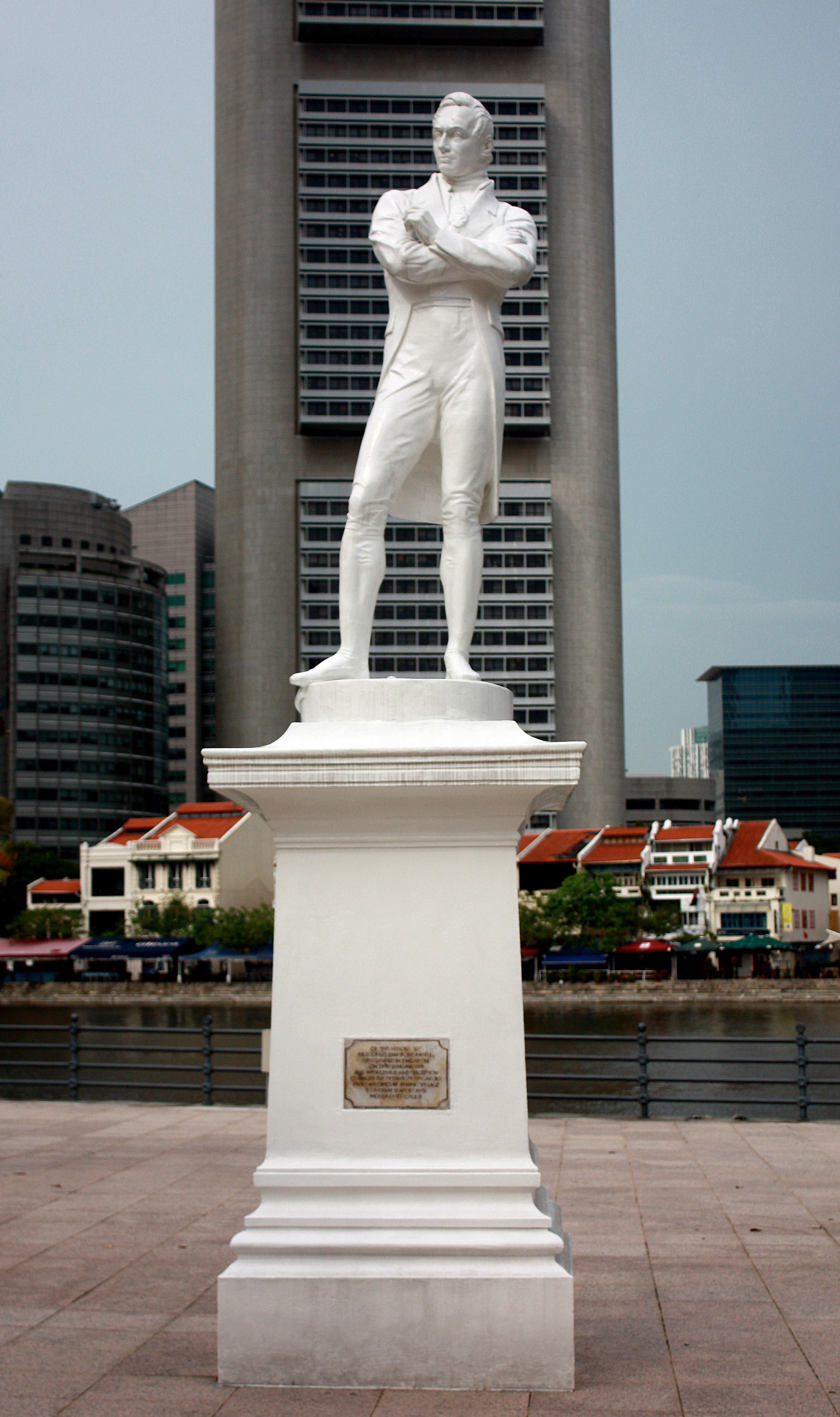
The statue in 2009

A white polymarble statue of Stamford Raffles is installed at Raffles's Landing Site in Singapore. It is a copy of Thomas Woolner's 1872 original bronze statue of Stamford Raffles which is located at Singapore's Victoria Memorial Hall.
