= Kallang MRT station =

Rapid transit station in Singapore

Kallang EW10 加冷 காலாங்
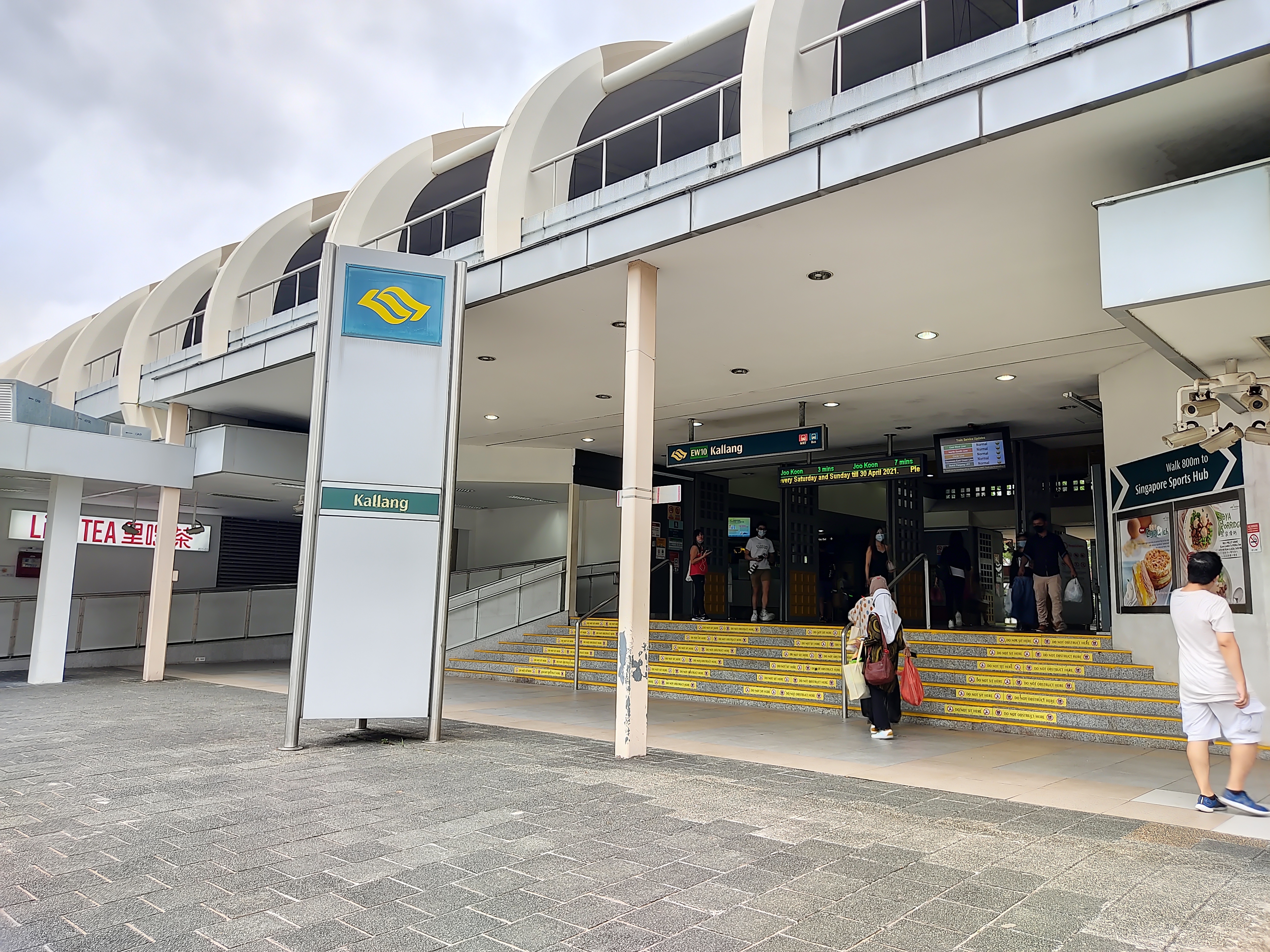
- Exit A of Kallang MRT station.

General information
- Location: 5 Sims Avenue; Singapore 387405
- Coordinates: 1°18′41.29″N 103°52′17.04″E
- System: Mass Rapid Transit (MRT) station
- Operator: SMRT Trains Ltd (SMRT Corporation)
- Line: East–West Line
- Platforms: 2 (1 island platform)
- Tracks: 2
- Connections: Lorong 1 Geylang Bus Terminal, Taxi

Construction
- Structure type: Elevated
- Platform levels: 1
- Parking: No
- Cycle facilities: Yes
- Accessible: Yes

History
- Opened: 4 November 1989; 36 years ago
- Former names: Geylang

Passengers
- June 2024: 11,515 per day

Services
| Preceding station | Mass Rapid Transit | Following station |
|---|---|---|
| Aljunied towards Pasir Ris | East–West Line | Lavender towards Tuas Link |
Track layout
Location
- Location within Singapore Rail

Kallang MRT station is an elevated Mass Rapid Transit (MRT) station on the East–West Line (EWL) in Kallang, Singapore. Operated by SMRT Trains, the station primarily serves the Kallang area as well as Lorong 1 Geylang bus terminal. Like many stations in the eastern portion of the EWL, it has a dome-shaped segmented roof. It is mostly wheelchair accessible and has bicycle facilities.

First announced in May 1982 as Geylang, it was to be constructed as part of Phase II of the MRT system. Its name was later changed in October 1983. Kallang station commenced operations on 4 November 1989 along with other stations on the eastern stretch of the line. Half-height platform screen doors were installed at the station in 2012, along with high-volume low-speed fans that following year.

== History ==
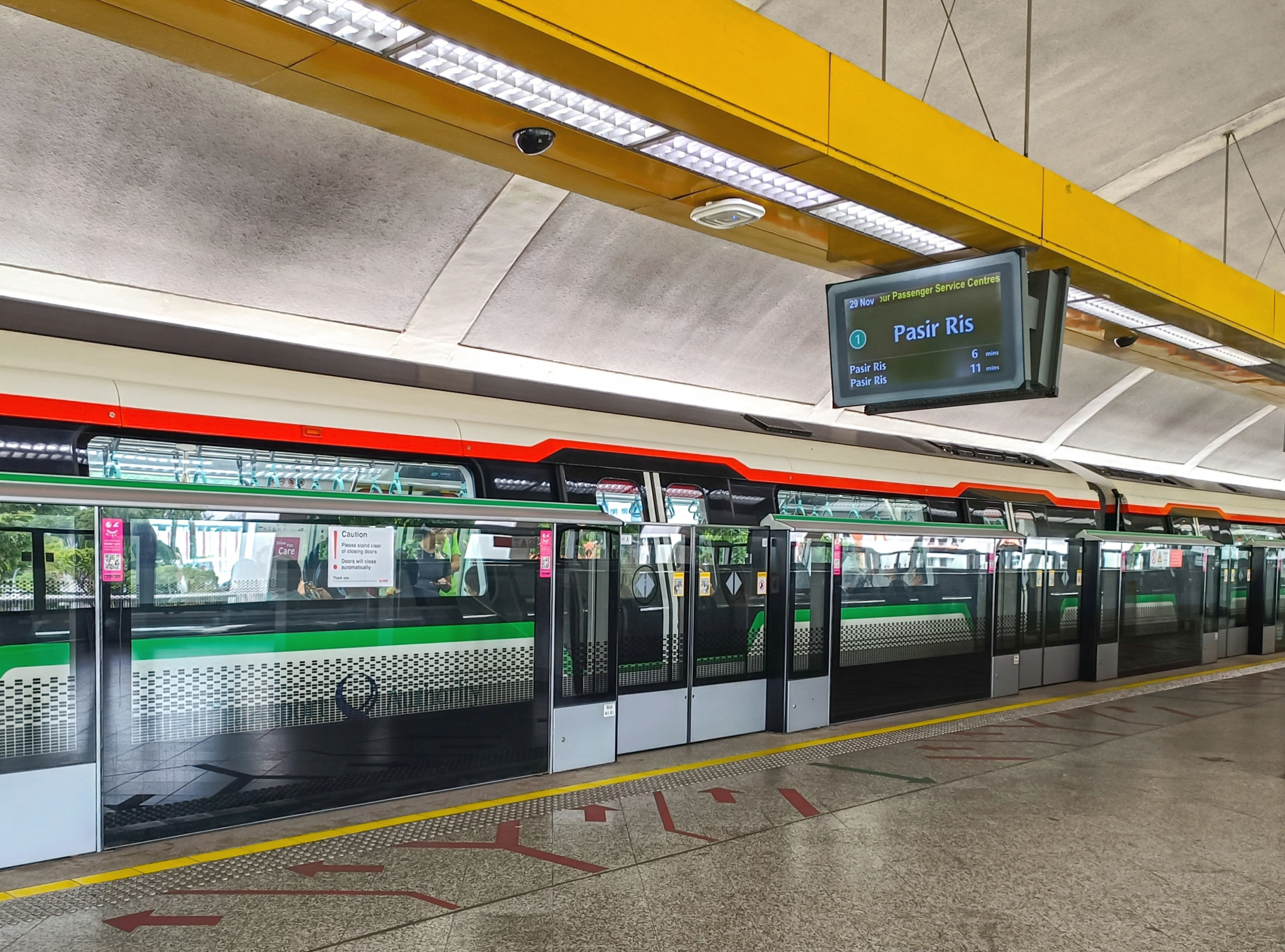
Station platforms

Kallang station was first included in the early plans of the MRT system as Geylang station in May 1982, later announced in October 1983 to be part of Phase II of the MRT as Kallang station.

There were several joint ventures between companies that prequalified for Contract 302 by May 1985, which detailed the construction for this station, Aljunied station, and a 115 metres (126 yd) long viaduct over the Kallang River. Ultimately, Contract 302 was awarded to a joint-venture between Lee Kim Tah Ltd and French company Societe Generale D'Enterprises Sainrapt Et Brice (SGE) at a contract sum of S$59.52 million (1985) (US$27.05 million) in November 1985. To build the viaducts between the tunnel and the station, parts of the Kallang River had to be drained in sections for piling works, with the rest of the works done similar to how it would be done on land. By May 1988, the viaducts in the Kallang River were already up. Kallang station opened on 4 November 1989 along with all other EWL segments from Bugis to Tanah Merah. The station was installed with high-volume low-speed fans by the first quarter of 2013.

=== Safety ===
On 16 August 1997, a 48-year-old man died after jumping into the path of an oncoming train, which ran him over. On 28 December 2005, a 32-year-old man died within minutes after he fell onto the tracks and was subsequently hit by an oncoming west-bound train, causing a temporary disruption for west-bound trains. The man is believed to have jumped to his death. Following a rise in track intrusions as well as commuters slipping when rushing for the train, the LTA and SMRT decided to install platform screen doors. After several tests at different stations, works for the half-height platform screen doors were expected to start in 2010, half-height platform screen doors with eventual installation and operations commencing at Kallang station by August 2011.

== Details ==
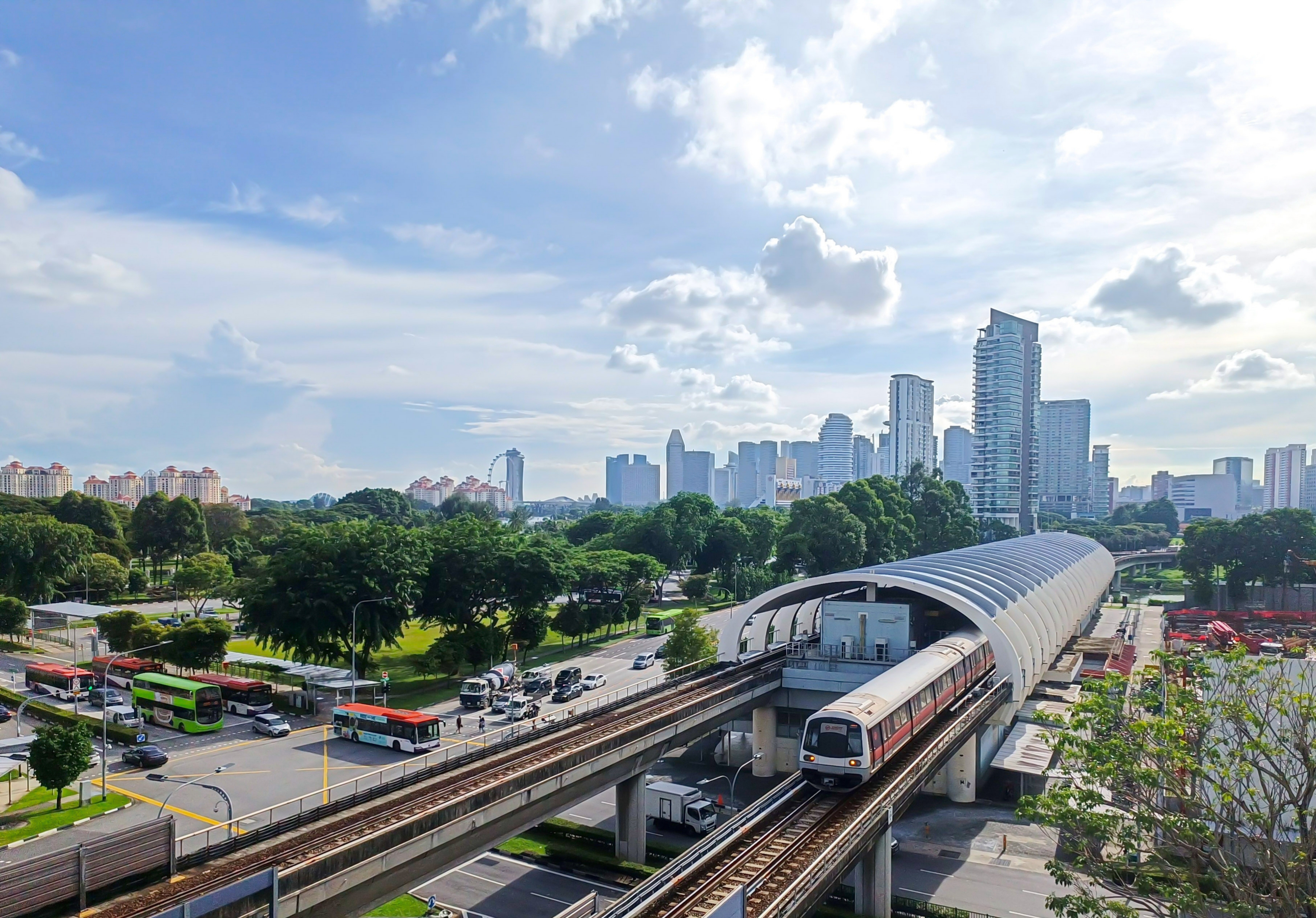
An aerial shot of Kallang station featuring its domed roof

Kallang station is on the EWL with the station number of EW10, situated between Lavender and Aljunied stations. When it opened, it had the station number of E3 before being changed to its current station code in August 2001 as a part of a system-wide campaign to cater to the expanding MRT System. As a part of the EWL, the station is operated by SMRT Trains. Like many stations on the initial MRT network, Kallang is an elevated station and has an island platform. It is wheelchair-accessible (except for Exit A) and has bicycle facilities.

The station runs alongside Sims Avenue and is bounded by Lorong 1 Geylang. It has two exits primarily serving the Geylang Lorong 1 Bus Terminal, National Stadium, and the Sri Sivan Temple. Prior to the opening of Stadium MRT station, it was the closest MRT station to the National Stadium, though it was a considerable distance away. It is still connected to the stadium via a sheltered linkway. Like many EWL stations in the East, Kallang station has a dome-shaped roof; it has been compared by The Straits Times to a caterpillar in one article and a rib cage in another article. The roof was an attempt by the MRT Corporation (MRTC) to give the stations on the EWL an "attractive look".
