= Soil bioengineering =

Soil and Water Bioengineering is a discipline of civil engineering. It pursues technological, ecological, economic as well as design goals and seeks to achieve these primarily by making use of living materials, i.e. seeds, plants, part of plants and plant communities, and employing them in near–natural constructions while exploiting the manifold abilities inherent in plants. Soil bioengineering may sometimes be a substitute for classical engineering works; however, in most cases it is a meaningful and necessary method of complementing the latter. Its application suggests itself in all fields of soil and hydraulic engineering, especially for slope and embankment stabilization and erosion control.

Soil bioengineering, also called ground bioengineering, is the use of living plant materials to provide some engineering function. Soil bioengineering is an effective tool for treatment of a variety of unstable and/or eroding sites. Soil bioengineering techniques have been used for many centuries. More recently Schiechtl (1980) has encouraged the use of soil bioengineering with a variety of European examples. Soil bioengineering is now widely practiced throughout the world for the treatment of erosion and unstable slopes.

== Fields of application and plants for soil bioengineering control works ==
Soil bioengineering methods can be applied wherever the plants which are used as living building materials are able to grow well and develop. This is the case in tropical, subtropical and temperate zones whereas there are obvious limits to plant growth in dry and cold regions, i.e. where arid, semi–arid and frost zones prevail. In exceptional cases, lack of water may be compensated for by watering or irrigation. In Europe, dry conditions limiting application exist in the Mediterranean as well as in some inner alpine and eastern European snowy regions. However, limits are most frequently imposed in alpine and arctic regions. These can usually be clearly noticed by the limited growth of woody plants (forest, tree and shrub lines) and the upper limits of closed turf cover. The more impoverished a region is in species, the less suited it is for the application of bioengineering methods.

== Functions and effects of soil bioengineering structures ==
=== Technical functions ===
- protection of soil surface from erosion by wind, precipitation, frost and flowing water
- protection from rock fall
- elimination or binding of destructive mechanical forces
- reduction of flow velocity along banks
- surface and/or deep soil cohesion and stabilization
- drainage
- protection from wind
- aiding the deposition of snow, drift sand and sediments
- increasing soil roughness and thus preventing avalanche release

Apart from these, ecological functions are gaining in importance, particularly as these can be fulfilled to a very limited extent only by classical engineering constructions.

=== Ecological functions ===
- addressing climate change challenges
- improvement of water regime by improved soil interception and storage capability as well as water consumption by plants
- soil drainage
- protection from wind
- protection from ambient air pollution
- mechanical soil amelioration by the roots of plants
- balancing of temperature conditions in near–ground layers of air and in the soil
- shading
- improvement of nutrient content in the soil and thus of soil fertility on previously raw soils
- balancing of snow deposits
- noise control
- yield increase on neighbouring cropland

=== Landscaping functions ===
- healing of wounds inflicted on the landscape by disasters (e.g. landslides, wildfires, hurricanes) and humans (e.g. exploitation of mineral resources, construction work, deposition of overburden, tunnel excavation material, industrial and domestic waste)
- integration of structures into the landscape (e.g. through landscaping)
- concealment of offending structures
- enrichment of the landscape by creating new features and structures, shapes and colours of vegetation

=== Economic effects ===
Bioengineering control works are not always necessarily cheaper in construction when compared to classical engineering structures. However, when taking into account their lifetime including their service and maintenance, they will normally turn out to be more economical. Their special advantages are:

- lower construction costs compared to “hard” constructions
- lower maintenance and rehabilitation costs (higher useful life)
- creation of useful green areas and woody plant populations on previously derelict land
- Useful for income generation

The result of soil bioengineering protection works are living systems which develop further and maintain their balance by natural succession (i.e. by dynamic self–control, without artificial input of energy). If the right living but also non–living building materials and the appropriate types of construction are chosen, exceptionally high sustainability requiring little maintenance effort can be achieved.
