= Sims Avenue =

Street in Singapore

Coordinates: 1.3158°N 103.8845°E

Sims Avenue (Chinese: 沈氏道) is a one-way major road in Singapore connecting Kallang Road to Jalan Eunos. It extends eastward as Sims Avenue East (Chinese: 沈氏东道), and until Siglap Road.

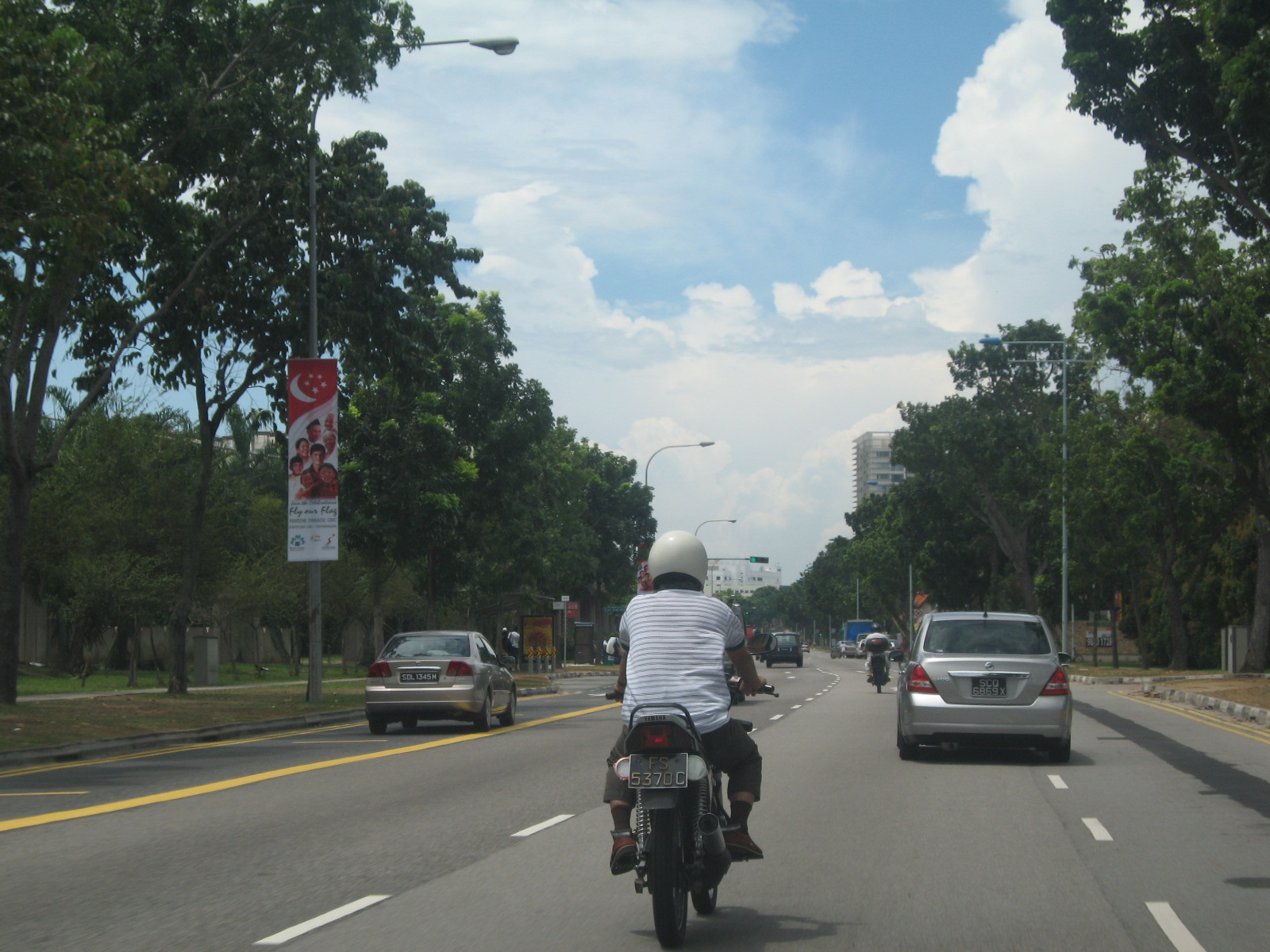
Sims Avenue East

== Etymology ==
The road was named after Sim Kia Jan, a Chinese businessman.

The Sims Avenue East portion used to be named as Jalan Rebong and Jalan Nanas in the 1960s. It was renamed to its current name in the 1980s.
