= Kallang River =

Longest river in Singapore

Coordinates: 1°18′N 103°52′E

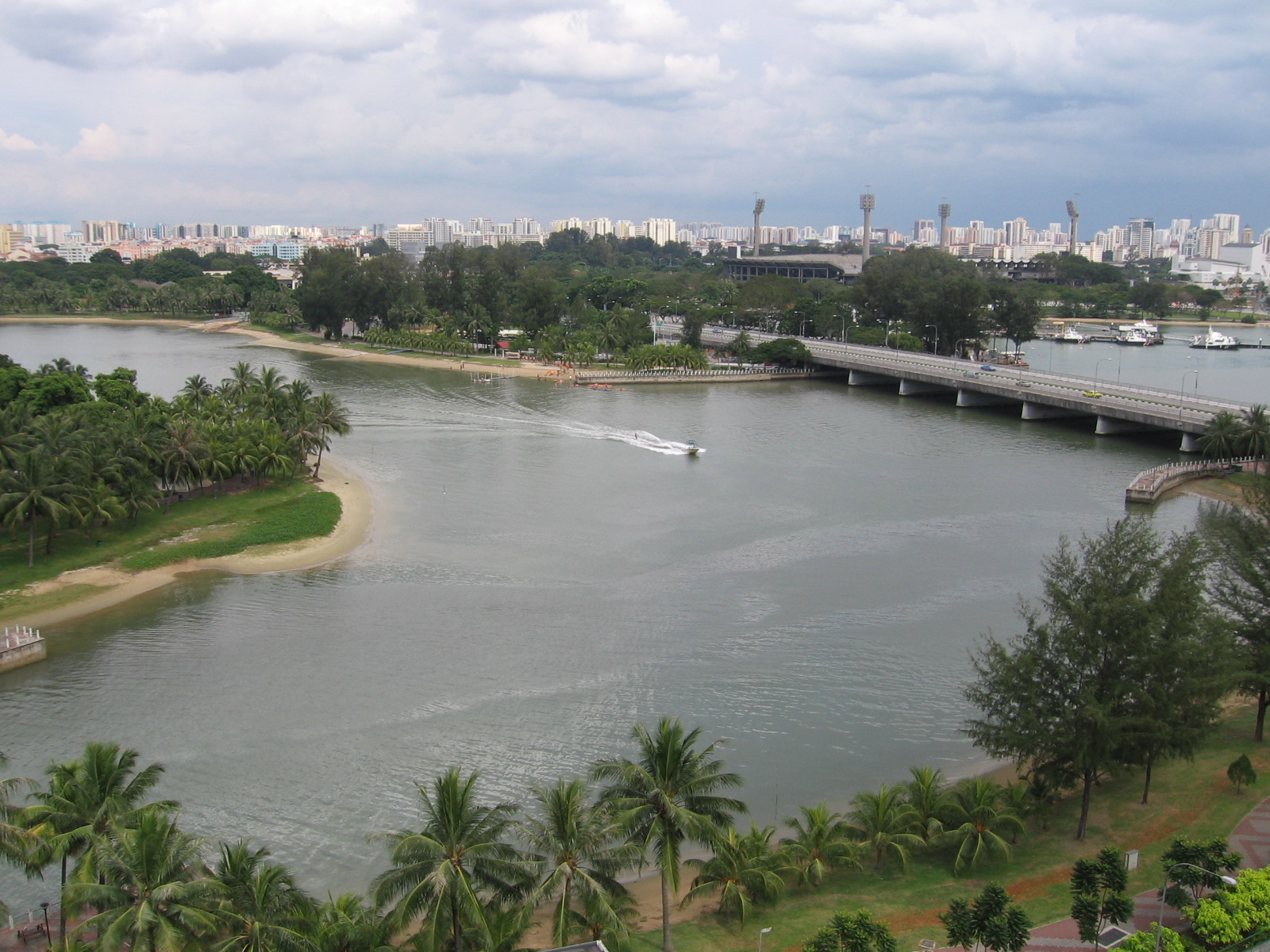
Mouth of Kallang River with Rochor River in the foreground. The Kallang River is a popular venue for many water sports such as waterskiing and wakeboarding.

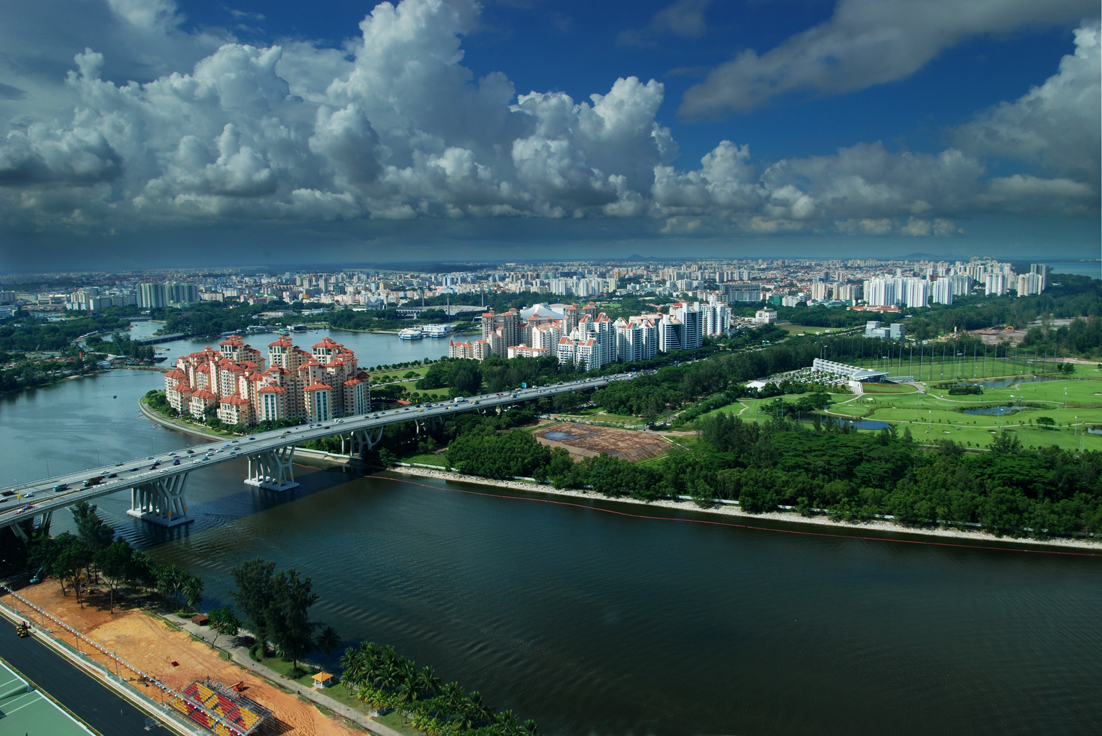
A view of the Kallang River from atop the Singapore Flyer

The Kallang River (Chinese: 加冷河, Malay: Sungei Kallang) is the longest river in Singapore, flowing for 10 kilometers from the Lower Peirce Reservoir (originally named "Kallang River Reservoir") to the Kallang Basin. It originates in the planning area of Central Water Catchment, flows in a southeast direction through Bishan and Toa Payoh, before finally arriving in Kallang.

== Course ==
Prior to extensive land reclamation along Singapore's southeastern coast, the Kallang River used to empty into the Singapore Straits at the Kallang Basin, near where Merdeka Bridge is standing. Today, the Kallang River flows into the open sea via the Marina Channel.

Tributaries of the Kallang River include Sungei Whampoa, the Pelton Canal, and the Bukit Timah Second Diversion Canal. Other rivers that empty into the Kallang Basin, other than the Kallang River, include the Geylang River and Rochor River. All these aforementioned waterways form part of the Marina Reservoir, as a result of the Marina Barrage.

== Tributaries ==
=== Pelton Canal ===
The Pelton Canal (Chinese: 佩尔顿水道) is a canalised river that flows from Ubi via MacPherson into the Kallang River in Kallang. It is one of the numerous tributaries of the Kallang River.

A section of the underground Kallang-Paya Lebar Expressway (KPE) follows the course of the Pelton Canal.

=== Sungei Whampoa ===
Sungei Whampoa (Malay for "Whampoa River", Chinese: 黄埔河) begins in Whampoa, near Jalan Rajah, and flows into the Kallang River in Kallang.

=== Bukit Timah Second Diversion Canal ===
The Bukit Timah Second Diversion Canal (Chinese: 武吉知马第二分水渠) is a canalised river flowing from Whampoa to Kallang, following closely the path of the Pan Island Expressway (PIE). It joins the Kallang River near the traffic interchange at Whampoa Flyover.

=== Others ===
Other than those listed above, there is another unnamed Kallang River tributary in Toa Payoh. It flows from Braddell Road, via Toa Payoh North and Lorong 6 Toa Payoh, before meeting the Kallang River at Lorong 8 Toa Payoh.

== History ==
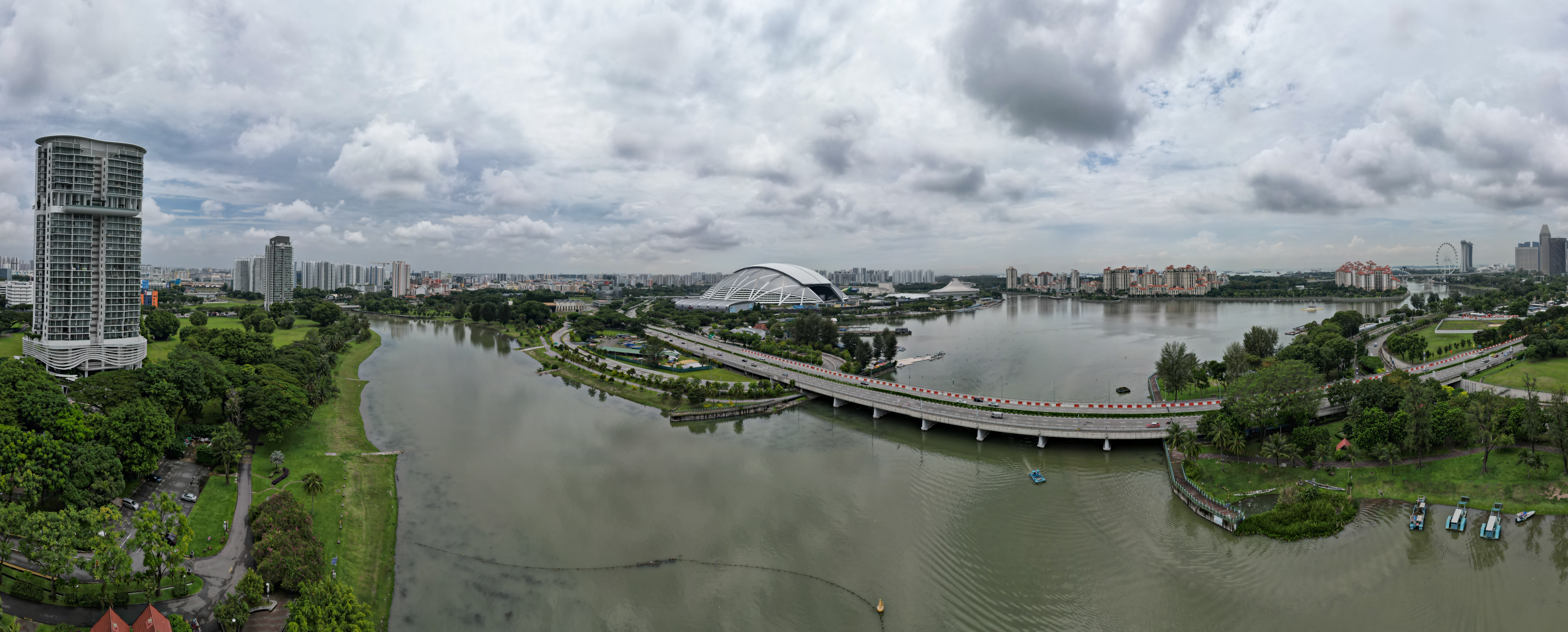
Kallang River panorama facing west towards the National Stadium

In pre-colonial times, the indigenous Orang Kallang tribe of the Orang Laut ethnic group lived in the swamps at the mouth of the Kallang River, and fished from their boats, seldom venturing out into the open sea. At the time of Sir Stamford Raffles landing in Singapore in 1819, half of the population of 1,000 were the Orang Kallang.

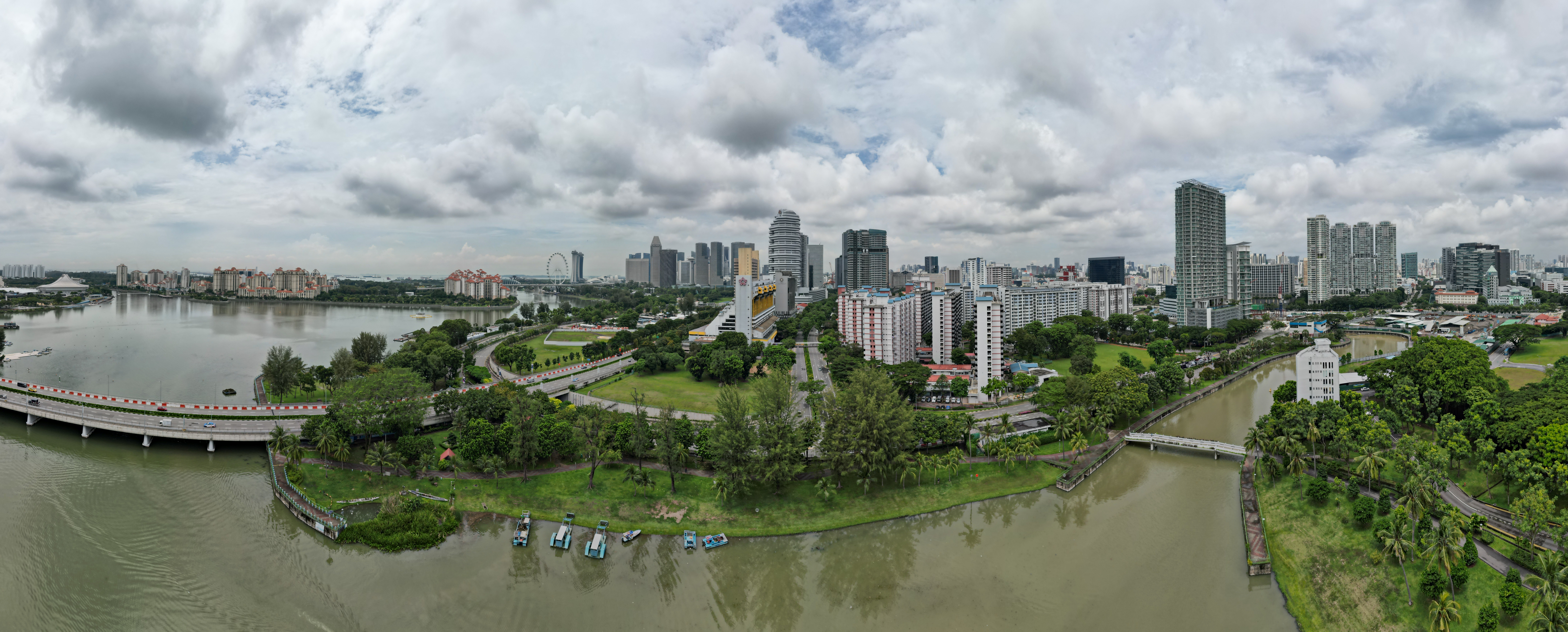
Kallang River panorama facing east towards the CBD

Kallang River was also the place, where in the early days the Bugis traders from Sulawesi (Celebes) unloaded their cargoes of spices and tortoise shells, gold dust and slaves from their palari or their leteh-leteh. These sailing boats were a common sight off the sea front even up to the 1960s. While no industry exists on the river now, it winds through an industrial estate at Kallang Basin, near Kallang Bahru,

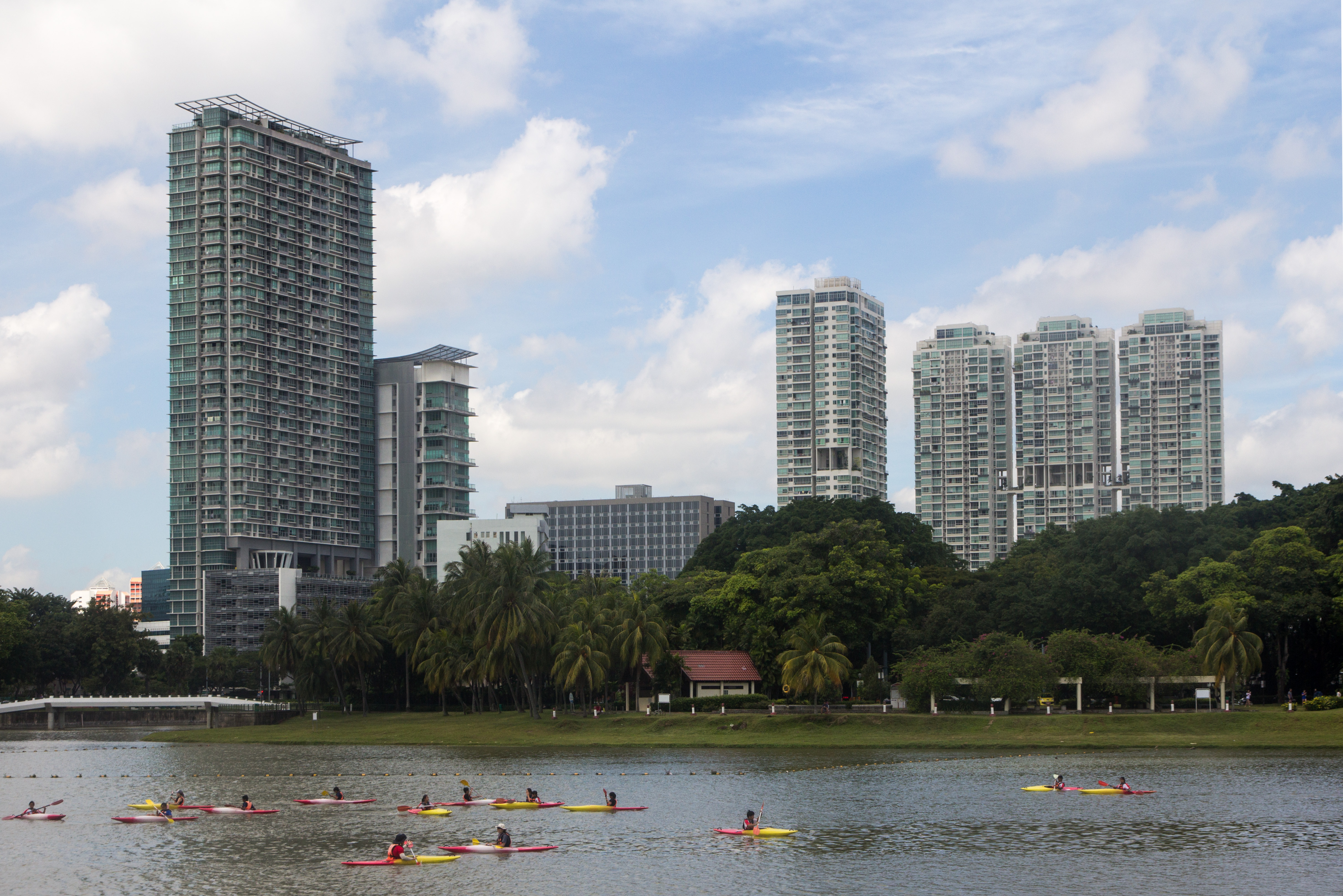
Buildings along the river and people kayaking

Kallang River is now part of the water catchment area for the Marina Reservoir. A dam, the Marina Barrage, was built at the mouth of the Marina Channel at Marina South. With the completion of the Marina Barrage in 2008, the entire region comprising the basins of the Singapore River, Rochor River, Geylang River and Kallang River has transformed into a water catchment area.

In April 2006, the Singapore government announced plans to give a 200-metre stretch of the Kallang River at Kolam Ayer a S$2.5 million facelift.

The "demonstration project" by the National Parks Board (NParks) and the Public Utilities Board (PUB) is part of the Active, Beautiful and Clean Waters Programme to transform rivers and reservoirs into vibrant community hubs, and to get Singaporeans to cherish and take care of their waterways. NParks and the PUB reviewed some of the world's best rivers such as the Charles River in the United States and the Cheonggye Stream in Seoul to draw inspiration and learn the most suitable practices.

By August 2007, the Kolam Ayer stretch of the river was transformed to include more greenery, floating decks, pathways and boardwalks for recreational activities. A water wheel was introduced as the centrepiece of the project. The water level was kept at a constant level (3 metres deep) making activities such as kayaking and dragon boating possible.

== Park ==
The Kallang Park Connector of the Park Connector Network (PCN) runs almost parallel to the Kallang River, providing a stretch of recreational space along the river. The Kallang Riverside Park straddles both sides of the Kallang River near the river mouth.

== Bishan-Ang Mo Kio Park ==
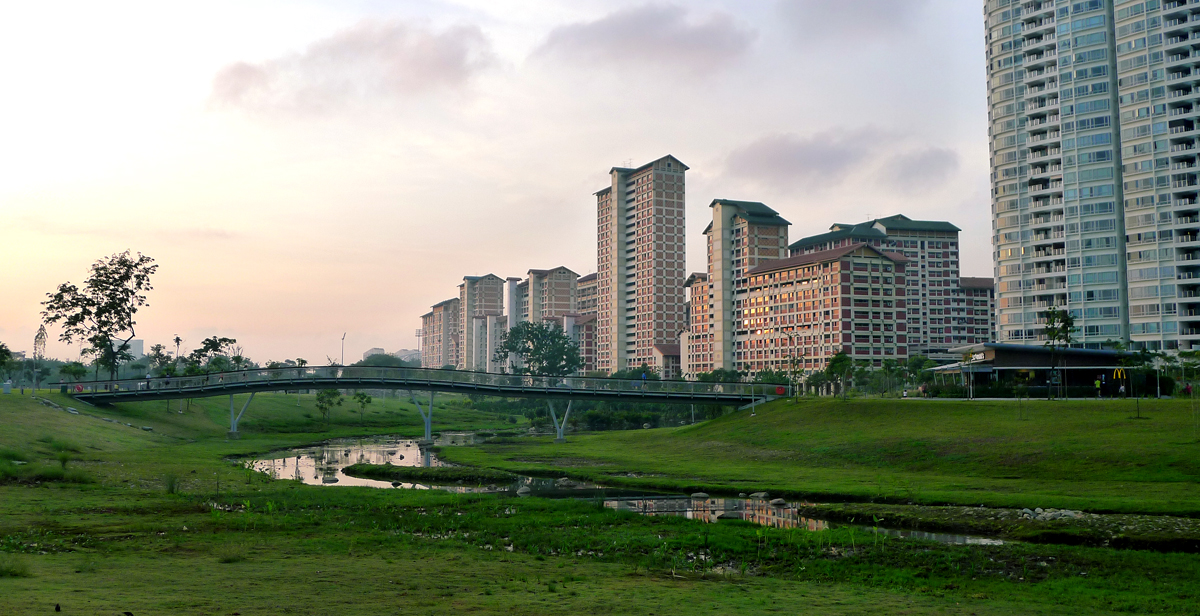
The Kallang River in Bishan-Ang Mo Kio Park

The upstream of the Kallang River is located at Bishan-Ang Mo Kio Park. Officially opened on 17 March 2012 by Prime Minister Lee Hsien Loong, the meandering river's capacity is now 40% more than when it was a canal. The river helps to slow the flow of rainwater so that downstream waterways have more time to drain. Bio-engineering techniques such as soil bioengineering and intensive hydraulic calculations were applied to create this. Besides slowing down rainwater, it now also offers residents a new recreational experience – soft planted river banks encourage people to get close to the water.

== See also ==
- Kallang River body parts murder

== External references ==
- Norman Edwards, Peter Keys (1996), Singapore - A Guide to Buildings, Streets, Places, Times Books International, ISBN 9971-65-231-5
