= Rochor River =

River in Singapore

Coordinates: 1°18′N 103°52′E

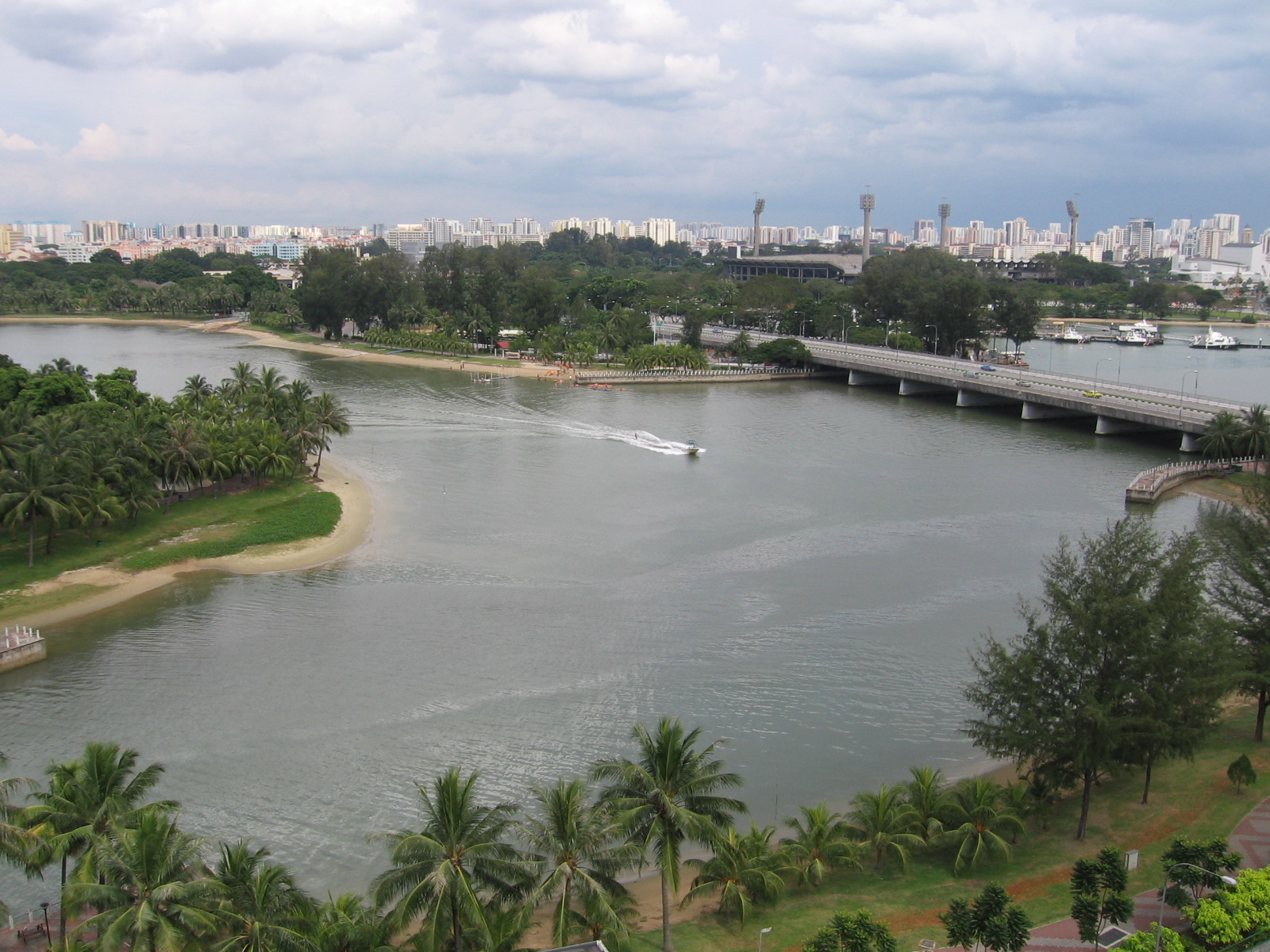
Mouth of Rochor River with Kallang River in the background.

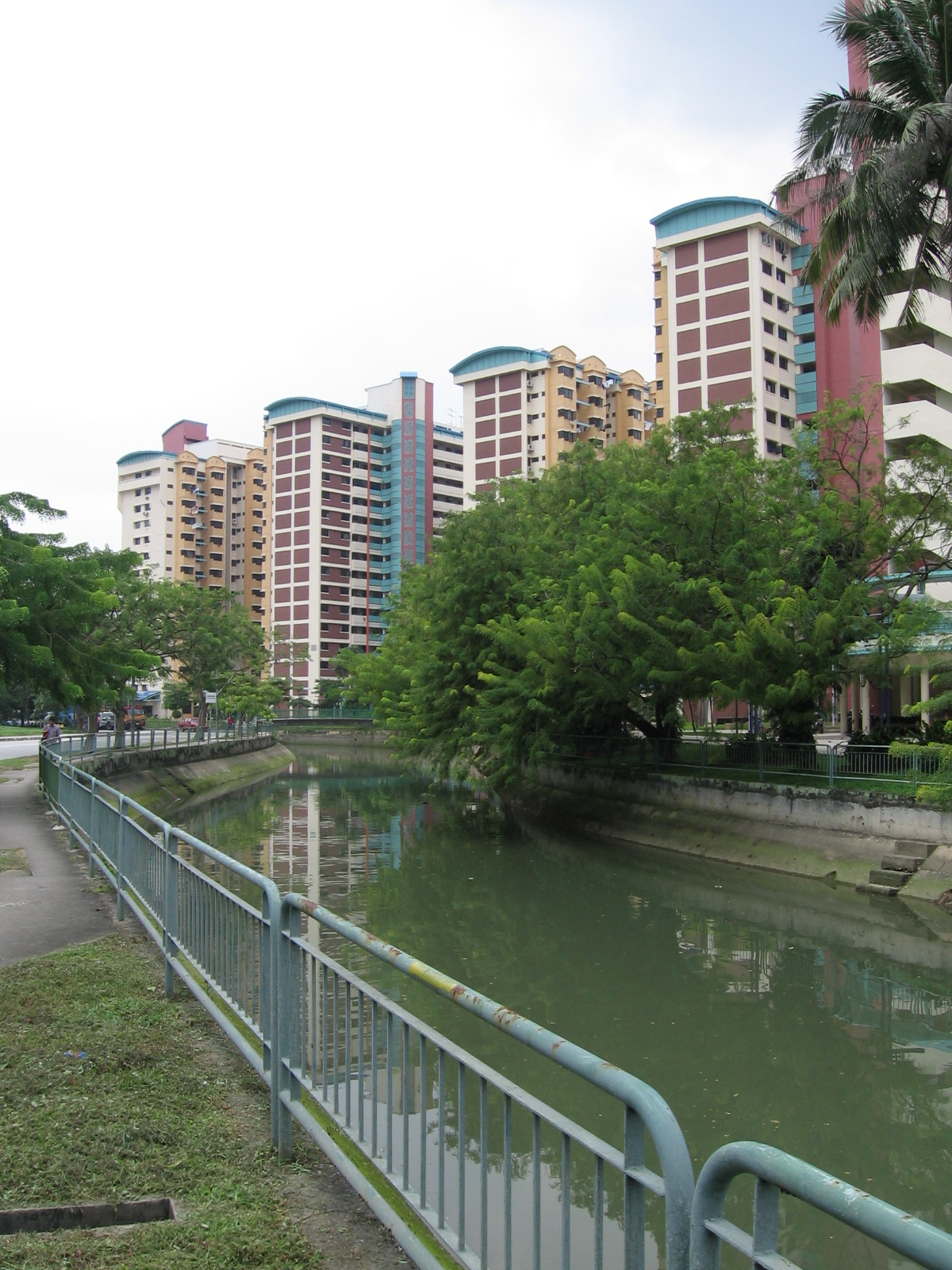
Rochor Canal

The Rochor River (IPA: /ˈroʊtʃoʊ, -ɔːr/ ROH-choh or ROH-chor; Chinese: 梧槽河; Malay: Sungei Rochor) is a small, canalised river in Kallang of the Central Region in Singapore. The river is about 0.8 km in length.

== Description ==
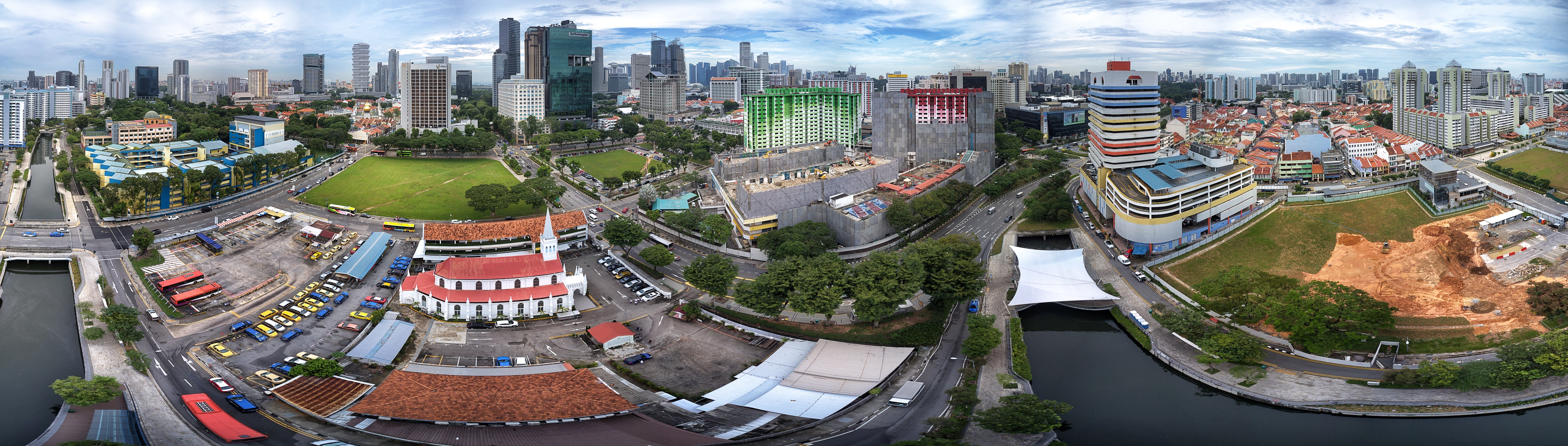
Rochor Canal Panorama, 2018

The Rochor River is a continuation of the Rochor Canal, and begins beneath Victoria Bridge and empties into the Kallang Basin. The Rochor Canal continues upstream as far as the junction of Jalan Jurong Kechil and Upper Bukit Timah Road; the source of the Rochor River lies in Beauty World MRT station, which has a possible extension to Tengah as part of the Deep Tunnel Sewerage System, it also has a canal that leads to the Kranji Reservoir. "Rochor Canal" is also the name of a subzone within the planning area of Rochor.

The river has often been regulated in the past and expanded by channels to control the floods in Bukit Timah. While the lower course is undoubtedly called the Rochor River, the Victoria Bridge upstream alternatively uses the name Rochor Canal. The canal has been cleaned and renovated frequently. As flooding continued to occur even with the channels, the Bukit Timah Flood Alleviation Scheme (BTFAS) of the Singapore National Water Agency PUB (built in the 1960s) added two additional service channels: the Bukit Timah First Diversion Canal (1966–1972, 3.2 km after Pandan Reservoir) and the Bukit Timah Second Diversion Canal (1990s, 4.4 km long, to Kallang Basin). They partly run underground in tunnels.

The originated in the 1830s Rochor Canal favored the emergence of cattle trading in Little India. With its water, the pastures were fed, where the buffalo grazed and where the trade was done with them. Today's wet market Tekka Center (also known as Tekka Market) used to be called Kandang Kerbau Market ("KK Market") in 1915, where "kerbau" in Malay roughly means "cattle enclosure". In addition to cattle breeding developed in this area, known as Kampong Kerbau ("Buffalo Village", about cattle village in Malay), farms such as slaughterhouses, dairy and similar. In the 1880s, oxen and cowsheds as well as pony and horse stables were to be found throughout the district. The cattle breeding reached its peak around 1900.

The river (and canal) used to be an important waterway for the timber industry, with many sawmills and wood factories on its banks. Throughout, tree trunks from Indonesia and Malaysia were transported to them. The timber industry continued on until the 1970s.

Built in 1836, the canal not only served as a conduit that separates Kampong Glam and Little India, it was also a source of portable water for several industries and a channel for the transportation of goods in the early years, as well as being used for irrigation for farmers. The canal was then given a clean look after a four-year long facelift under the Public Utilities Board (PUB) Active, Beautiful, and Clean Waters programme on 8 March 2015. Today, the canal has been transformed into an urban boulevard with amenities such as benches, pedestrian bridges and community plaza that stitches together the neighborhoods along its route.

In 2011, the Water Authority PUB – Singapore's National Water Agency decided to build a 1.1 km section of the Rochor Canal, which was particularly degenerate. This redevelopment was part of the program "Active, Beautiful, Clean Waters Program" (ABC Water program); the cost was estimated at S $48 million. There should be an attractive stretch of the river with urban boulevard, promenades, pedestrian bridges, terraces, several gardens and a community space. The new section, which replaced the old unhygienic canal management, was officially opened on 8 March 2015.
