= Crawford, Singapore =

Crawford
- Subzone of Kallang Planning Area

Other transcription(s)
  - Chinese: 哥罗福
  - Malay: Crawford
  - Tamil: கிராஃபர்ட்
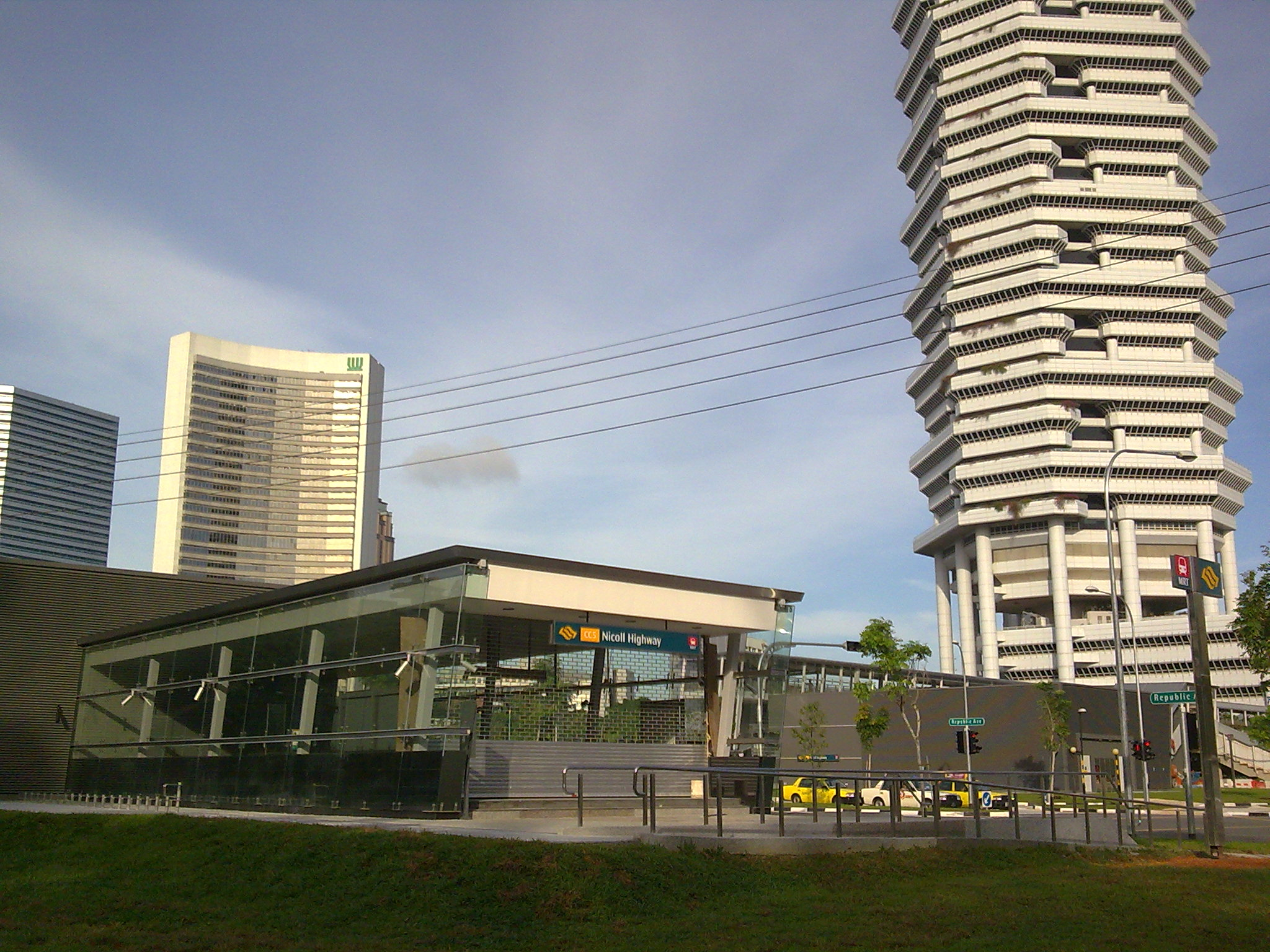
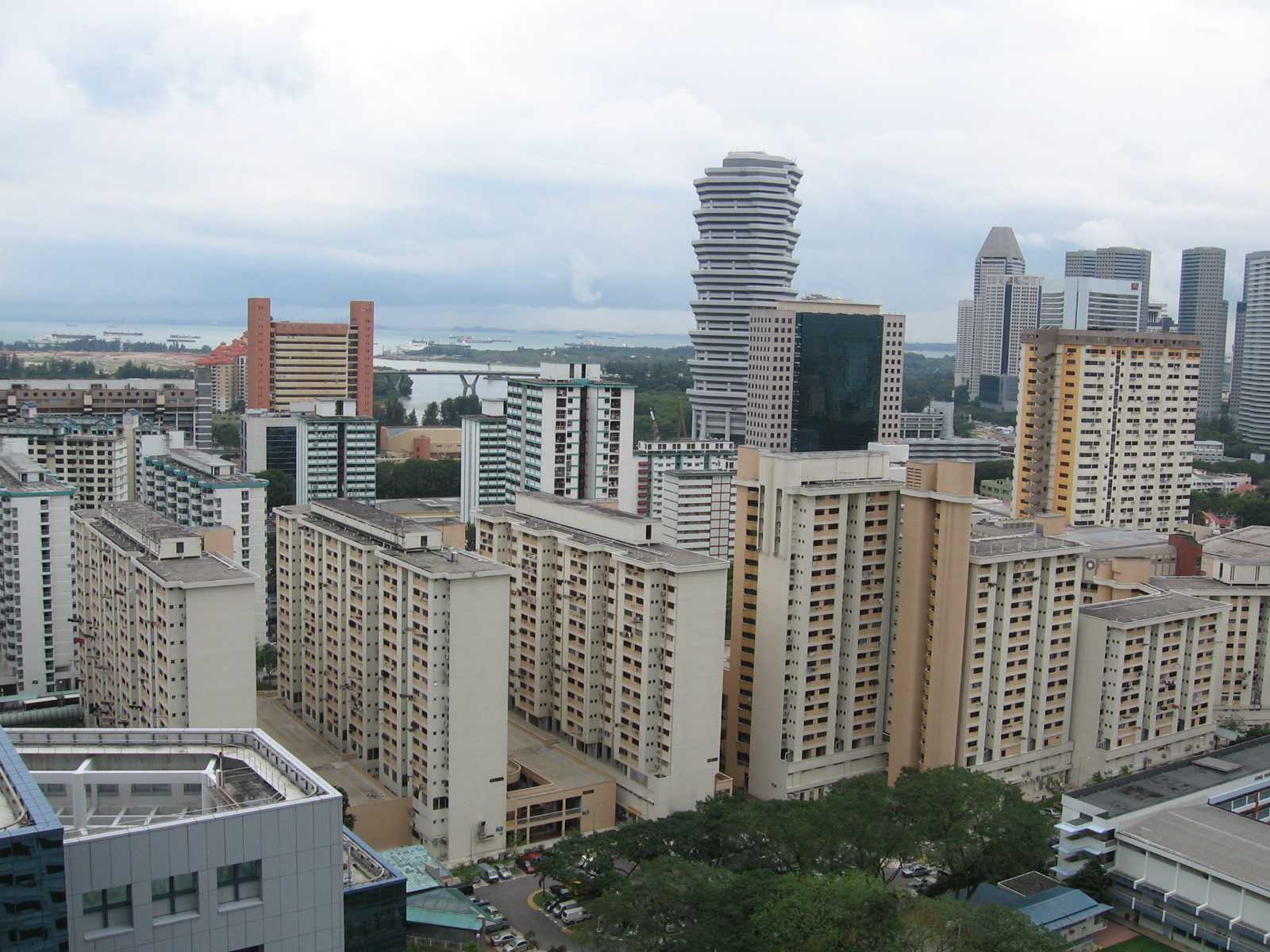
- Top: Exit of Nicoll Highway MRT station along Republic Avenue; Bottom: Housing and Development Board (HDB) flats at Crawford Lane
- Interactive map of Crawford
- Coordinates: 1.3045°N 103.863°E
- Country: Singapore
- Region: Central Region
- Planning Area: Kallang

Crawford (Chinese: 哥罗福) is a subzone within the planning area of Kallang, Singapore, as defined by the Urban Redevelopment Authority (URA). Its perimeter is made up of Rochor River and Rochor Canal in the north; Crawford Street, Nicoll Highway, Kallang Basin and Marina Channel in the east; East Coast Parkway (ECP) in the south; as well as Ophir Road, Beach Road and Jalan Sultan in the west.

As Crawford is located directly adjacent to the Downtown Core, many commercial developments have since sprung up in this area. Landmarks include The Concourse, The Plaza, Golden Mile Complex, St John Headquarters, Masjid Hajjah Fatimah, Kallang Riverside Park and Marina Promenade.
