= Nicoll Highway collapse =

2004 construction accident in Singapore

- Site of the collapsed highway
- Date: 20 April 2004; 22 years ago
- Time: 3:30 pm SST
- Location: Nicoll Highway, Singapore; 1°18′09″N 103°51′57″E
- Type: Construction accident
- Cause: Poorly designed strut-waler support system, leading to collapse of tunnel retaining wall and highway collapse
- Deaths: 4
- Injuries: 3
- Convicted: Nishimatsu (contracting company) and three officials. LTA qualified personnel
- Sentence: Fined under the Factories Act and Building Control Act

The Nicoll Highway collapse occurred in Singapore on 20 April 2004 at 3:30 pm local time when a Mass Rapid Transit (MRT) tunnel construction site caved in, leading to the collapse of the Nicoll Highway near the Merdeka Bridge. Four workers were killed and three were injured, delaying the construction of the Circle Line (CCL).

The collapse was caused by a poorly designed strut-waler support system, a lack of monitoring and proper management of data caused by human error, and organisational failures of the Land Transport Authority (LTA) and construction contractors Nishimatsu and Lum Chang. The Singapore Civil Defence Force extracted three bodies from the site but were unable to retrieve the last due to unstable soil. An inquiry was conducted by Singapore's Manpower Ministry from August 2004 to May 2005, after which three Nishimatsu engineers and an LTA officer were charged under the Factories Act and Building Control Act respectively, and all four defendants were fined. The contractors gave S$30,000 (US$20,000) each to the families of the victims as unconditional compensation.

Following the incident, the collapsed site was refilled, and Nicoll Highway was rebuilt and reopened to traffic on 4 December 2004. Heng Yeow Pheow, an LTA foreman whose body was never recovered, was posthumously awarded the Pingat Keberanian (Medal of Valour) for helping his colleagues to safety ahead of himself. In response to inquiry reports, the LTA and the Building and Construction Authority (BCA) revised their construction safety measures so they were above industry standards. The CCL tunnels were realigned, with Nicoll Highway station rebuilt to the south of the original site underneath Republic Avenue. The station and tunnels opened on 17 April 2010, three years later than planned.

== Background ==
=== Nicoll Highway and Merdeka Bridge ===
The Singapore Improvement Trust first planned Nicoll Highway in the late 1940s to relieve the heavy rush-hour traffic along Kallang Road and provide an alternative route from Singapore's city centre to Katong and Changi. These plans were finalised in July 1953; they included construction of a bridge spanning the Kallang and Rochor rivers. The construction contract for Kallang Bridge was awarded to Paul Y. Construction Company in association with Messrs Hume Industries and Messrs Sime Darby for $4.485 million (US$15 million in 2021) in December 1954. On 22 June 1956, Kallang Bridge was renamed Merdeka Bridge to reflect "the confidence and aspiration of the people of Singapore". Merdeka Bridge and Nicoll Highway opened on 17 August that year; crowds gathered on both ends of the bridge to witness the opening ceremony. By August 1967, the highway and the bridge had been widened to accommodate seven lanes.

=== Nicoll Highway station ===
Nicoll Highway station was first announced in November 1999 as part of the Mass Rapid Transit's (MRT) Marina Line (MRL), which consisted of six stations from Dhoby Ghaut to Stadium. In 2001, Nicoll Highway station became part of Circle Line (CCL) Stage 1 when the MRL was incorporated into the CCL. The contract for the construction of Nicoll Highway station and tunnels was awarded to a joint venture between Nishimatsu Construction Co Ltd and Lum Chang Building Contractors Pte Ltd at S$270 million (US$200 million) on 31 May 2001. In 1996, the joint venture was investigated for breaching safety rules in a previous project; infringements included loose planks on its scaffolding. In 1997, the companies damaged underground telecommunications cables in another underpass construction project.

The site was on land reclaimed during the 1970s and consisted of silty old alluvium and a 40 m (130 ft) layer of marine clay resulting from sea-level changes of the Kallang Basin. The station and tunnels were constructed from the "bottom-up": cut-and-cover excavation was supported by a network of steel king posts, walers, and struts to keep the site open.

== Incident ==
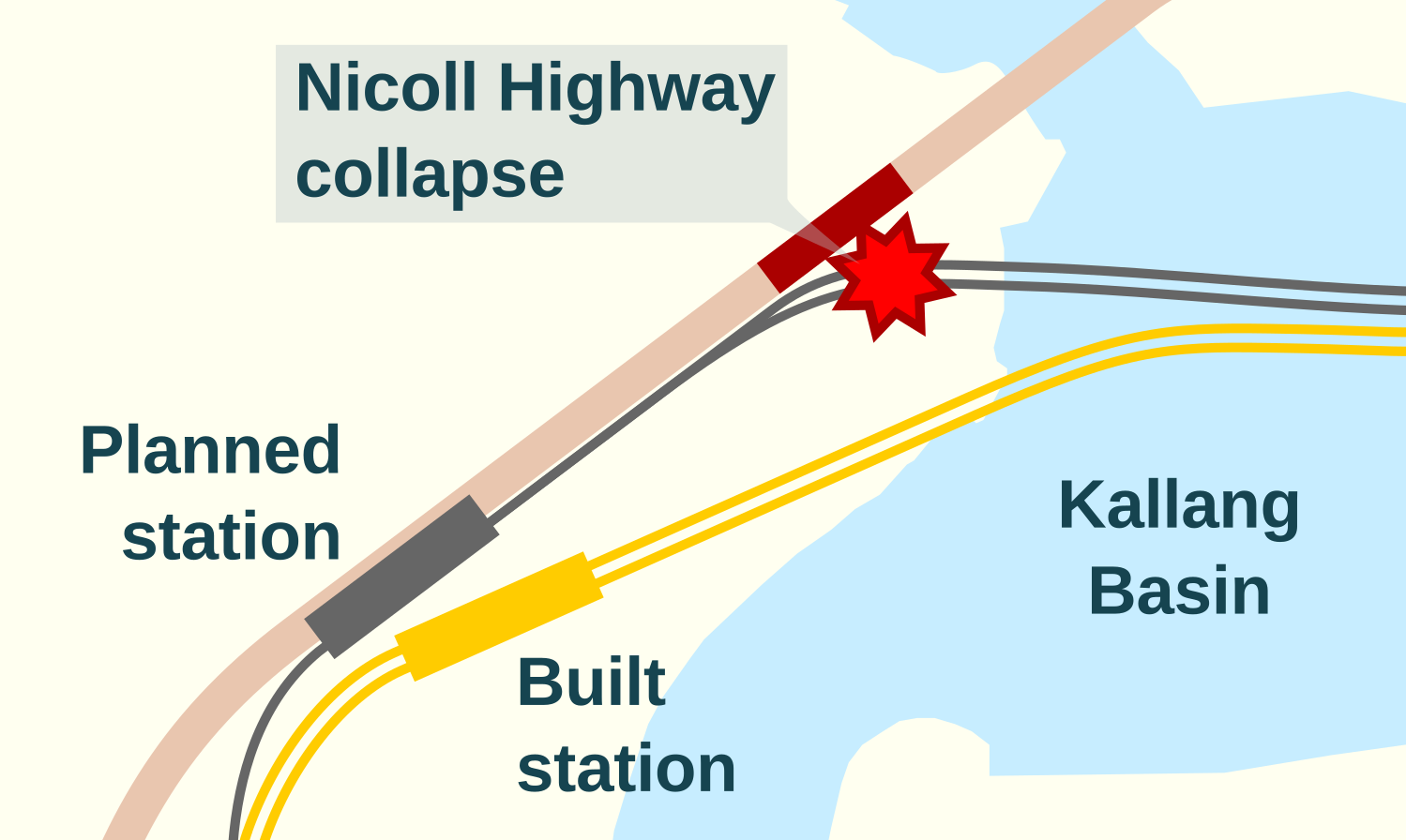
Map of the incident site

At about 3:30 pm local time on 20 April 2004, tunnels linking to Nicoll Highway station caved in along with a 100-metre (300-foot) stretch of Nicoll Highway near the abutment of Merdeka Bridge. The incident happened when most of the workers were on a tea break. The collapse of a tunnel's retaining wall created a hole 100 m long, 130 m wide, and 30 m deep (330 by 430 by 100 ft). One person was found dead and three others, who were working on driving machinery at the bottom of the site, were initially reported missing. They included a foreman who had helped evacuate his workers to safety when the site collapsed but did not escape in time because a flight of exit stairs collapsed. Three injured workers were taken to hospital for treatment; two of them were discharged the same day. No motorists were driving along the stretch of road when it collapsed and others stopped in time.

Three power cables were severed, resulting in a 15-minute blackout in the Esplanade, Suntec City, and Marina Square regions. The collapse of the highway damaged a gas service line. From initial reports, eyewitnesses heard explosions and saw flames flashing across the highway; the Land Transport Authority (LTA), Singapore's transport agency, said it had no evidence of an explosion and that the witnesses might have mistaken the loud sound of the collapse for an explosion. As a precautionary measure, gas supply to the damaged pipe was shut off.

== Rescue and safety measures ==
The Singapore Civil Defence Force (SCDF) arrived at the site at 3:42 pm. After rescuing the three injured people, specialist SCDF units, such as the Disaster Assistance and Rescue Team and Search Platoon, arrived as reinforcements to search for the missing workers. The first dead victim was found at 6:07 pm. All machinery was turned off as the SCDF used a life-detector device in the collapse site but nothing was detected and sniffer dogs were brought into the search. The second body was recovered at 11:42 pm on 21 April.

Prime Minister Goh Chok Tong visited the site on 21 April; he praised the coordination between the SCDF and the Public Utilities Board (PUB) for the ongoing rescue efforts and expressed relief at the small number of fatalities. Goh extended his condolences to the families of the victims and said the rescue efforts should be the priority rather than apportioning blame. He added the government would convene a public inquiry. President S R Nathan visited the site on 22 April to pay tribute to the rescue workers.

A third body was recovered from the site on 22 April at 12:15 am. The SCDF had to vertically excavate through a pile of rubble and debris located within three cavities, two of which were flooded and blocked by twisted steel beams and struts. The operation presented significant difficulty due to the limited space for manoeuvring within the cavities and the lack of visibility in flooded areas. The LTA detected stability problems on 23 April at 1:05 am and grouting was implemented to stabilise the soil while water was pumped out from cavities, allowing rescuers to further investigate. Heavy rain in the afternoon caused soil erosion and halted the search. Because of the instability of the collapsed area that could bury rescue workers and cause more damage to the surrounding area, the search for the foreman, Heng Yeow Pheow, was called off at 3:30 pm.

The Nicoll Highway collapse led to the deaths of four people:

- Vadivil s/o Nadesan, crane operator: A Malaysian of Indian descent, his body was the first to be recovered. The 45-year-old had tried to escape by jumping out of his crane when the incident occurred. He was found caught between a pick-up truck and a container.
- Liu Rong Quan, construction worker: The body of the 36-year-old Chinese national was found wedged between the wheel and chassis of a 10-tonne (22,000 lb) truck. He had started working at the site ten days before the incident.
- John Tan Lock Yong, LTA engineer: Tan, the third victim to be found, was found between a tipper truck and a container. He had been working on the station construction project for two years.
- Heng Yeow Pheow, LTA foreman whose body was never recovered. According to survivor accounts, he had hurried his workers to safety, saving eight, but was trapped when the collapse occurred.

Safety measures were implemented after the collapse to minimise further damage to the collapsed area. A damaged canal had to be blocked up to prevent water from the Kallang River from entering the site, and canvas sheets were laid on slopes in the site to protect the soil. While the surrounding buildings were assessed to be safe, they were later monitored for stability with additional settlement markers and electro-level beams that were installed at the nearby Golden Mile Complex. The LTA halted work at 16 of the 24 CCL excavation sites so these could be reviewed.

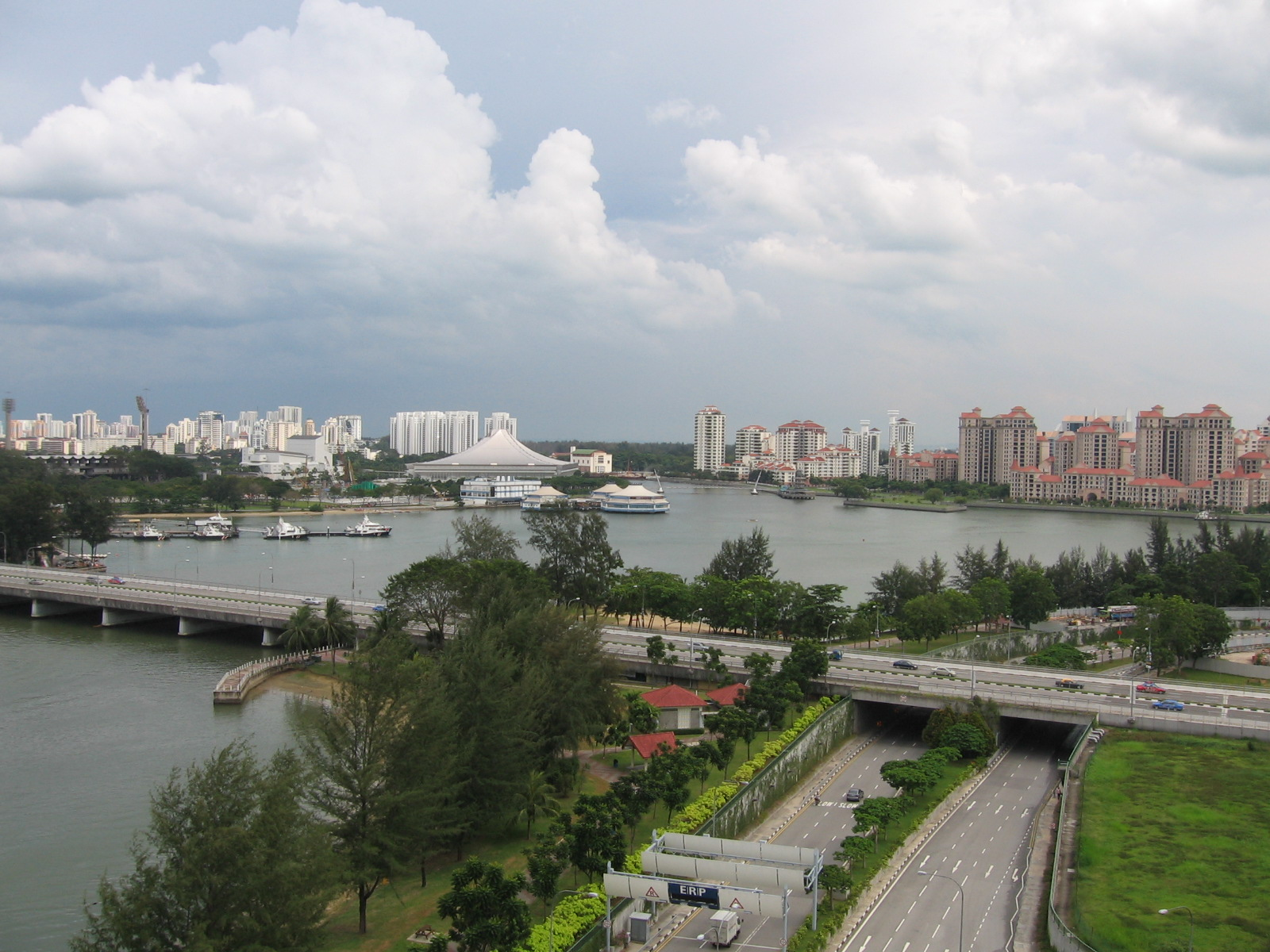
The Merdeka Bridge over the Crawford Underpass

Near the incident site, the approach slab before the abutment of Merdeka Bridge had collapsed. To prevent displacement of the first span triggering the collapse of the 610-metre (2,000 ft) bridge, the first and second spans of the bridge were cut to isolate the first span. This also allowed Crawford Underpass beneath the bridge to be reopened. This project began on 23 April and was completed on 28 April. Eight prism points and five tiltmeters were installed to monitor any bridge movements.

The collapsed site was quickly stabilised through the injection of concrete into areas that were vulnerable to movement or further collapse. Several vehicles, equipment and construction materials were retrieved using a specialised crane. The remaining equipment and materials at the site were buried under infill to avoid further collapse. Access to the collapsed site via the completed parts of the tunnel and the shaft was sealed off.

== Committee of Inquiry ==
Singaporean authorities dismissed terrorism and sabotage as causes of the incident. On 22 April, Singapore's Ministry of Manpower established a Committee of Inquiry (COI) to investigate the cause of the incident. Senior District Judge Richard Magnus was appointed Chairman; he was assisted by assessors Teh Cee Ing from the Nanyang Technological University (NTU) and Lau Joo Ming from the Housing and Development Board. The COI called for 143 witnesses to provide evidence, including 14 experts. The COI visited the site on 23 April and the inquiry was originally scheduled for 1 June. Because all parties involved would need two-and-a-half months to prepare due to complex technical content, the inquiry was postponed to 2 August.

=== Inquiry ===
At the first hearing of the inquiry, the inquiry panel established that there were "fundamental" design flaws in the worksite due to incorrect analysis of soil conditions by the contractors, leading to more pressure on the retaining walls. In April, the LTA had said the collapse happened without warning but the LTA had already found flaws in Nishimatsu–Lum Chang's design in October 2001: the contractor used a design-software simulator with incorrect parameters. An alternative design had been proposed in consultation with an NTU professor but the contractor had rejected the design. The LTA technical advisor for design management had advised against excavation of the site due to incorrect data.

In the two months before the cave-in, the tunnel's retaining walls had moved more than the maximum allowed. The contractors had petitioned the LTA to increase the agreed maximum threshold of movement. The contractors had miscalculated the amount of stress on the retaining walls but gave the LTA repeated assurances that their calculations were in order. Nishimatsu's senior on-site supervisor Teng Fong Sin claimed ignorance of the significance of the trigger values taken from the retaining wall. Teng said even if he had been aware of the significance, he lacked the authority to halt the ongoing work.

No readings were taken in the two days leading up to the collapse. This was because soil-monitoring instruments, which were placed roughly in the centre of the collapsed area, had been buried and the site supervisor Chakkarapani Balasubramani did not take the readings, although he raised the issue with the main contractor and was told the instruments would be dug out. Nishimatsu engineer Arumaithurai Ahilan said he saw "nothing alarming" in the soil-movement readings and accused Balasubramani of lying in testimony. While he was also alerted to other ground movements, Nishimatsu addressed these cracks by applying cement patches, and no further corrective actions were taken because the buildings did not suffer any structural damage. According to a system analyst from Monosys, the project's subcontractor, the strain-detecting sensors recorded readings that were still below trigger values at 3 pm. These readings were the last obtained before the collapse at 3:30 pm.

The steel beams to hold up the walls had not been constructed when workers dug further into the site. LTA supervisor Phang Kok Pin, whose duty was to confirm the correct installation of support beams, said he visited the pit typically once or twice a day. He conducted only sporadic inspections and heavily relied on reports from Nishimatsu contractors to confirm the accurate installation of the beams.

Nishimatsu supervisors were warned about failing support structures on the day of the collapse but instructed the subcontracting site supervisor Nallusamy Ramadoss to continue installing struts and pouring cement on the buckled struts to strengthen the wall. The struts continued to bend further before the collapse; Ramadoss warned his workers of the danger and evacuated them to safety. Some workers said they were not warned of any danger or given any safety briefings but escaped in time. Other workers also reported hearing "thungs" of bent walers before the cable bridge swayed, and everything around them trembled and collapsed.

=== Resumption and conclusion ===
The inquiry was adjourned on 30 August and resumed on 6 September. An interim report that was released to the government on 13 September noted "glaring and critical shortcomings" in the construction project that were seen in other ongoing construction projects. Additionally, inexperienced personnel had been appointed to monitor the safety of the retaining wall system. The interim report recommended a more-effective safety management system, an industry standard for the safety of temporary works, and a higher standard of reliability and accuracy in monitoring data. The interim report was released so "corrective measures" could be implemented for other construction projects.

The LTA project manager Wong Hon Peng, who was informed of the deflection readings four days before the collapse, admitted his lack of respect for safety, that his initial response was "any solution adopted should not bring about claims against LTA" and that he failed to take heed of the warnings. The project manager from Nishimatsu, Yoshiaki Chikushi, also said he was unaware of the extent to which the struts supporting the construction site had buckled, and was consulting with the LTA on the day of the collapse after being alerted of the failing struts. To meet deadlines, Chikushi had accelerated the hacking of a wall that led to the removal of support beams in the excavation, and approved the grouting method that left gaps under some cables running across the site. He did not consider how these methods would cause problems. The final phase of the hearing, which involved the consultation of experts on the causes of weakening of the retaining wall, began on 24 January 2005 and concluded on 2 February. More than 170 witnesses were brought in during the 80 days of the inquiry.

The COI released its final report on 13 February 2005; it concluded the incident was preventable and had been caused by human error and organisational failures. The strut-waler support system was poorly designed and was weaker than it should have been, and there was a lack of monitoring and proper management of data. The COI report said the "warning signs", such as excessive wall deflections and surging inclinometer readings, were not seriously addressed, and blamed the collapse on the contractor. The people responsible were accused of indifference and laxity towards the worksite safety of the construction project. To address the lack of safety culture stated in the report, the COI restated several recommendations from its interim report to improve the safety of construction projects. The government accepted the report's recommendations.

== Aftermath ==
=== Compensation to the victims ===
Family of the victims were given S$30,000 (US$20,000) each as unconditional, ex gratia compensation by Nishimatsu and Lum Chang. Heng's family received an additional S$380,000 (US$280,000) in settlements from the three construction firms involved with the collapse and S$630,000 (US$460,000) in public donations. The money from the public donations was diverted into a trust fund that was set up by Heng's Member of Parliament Irene Ng from which expenses for his children's upkeep could be drawn until 2019.

=== Honours and awards ===
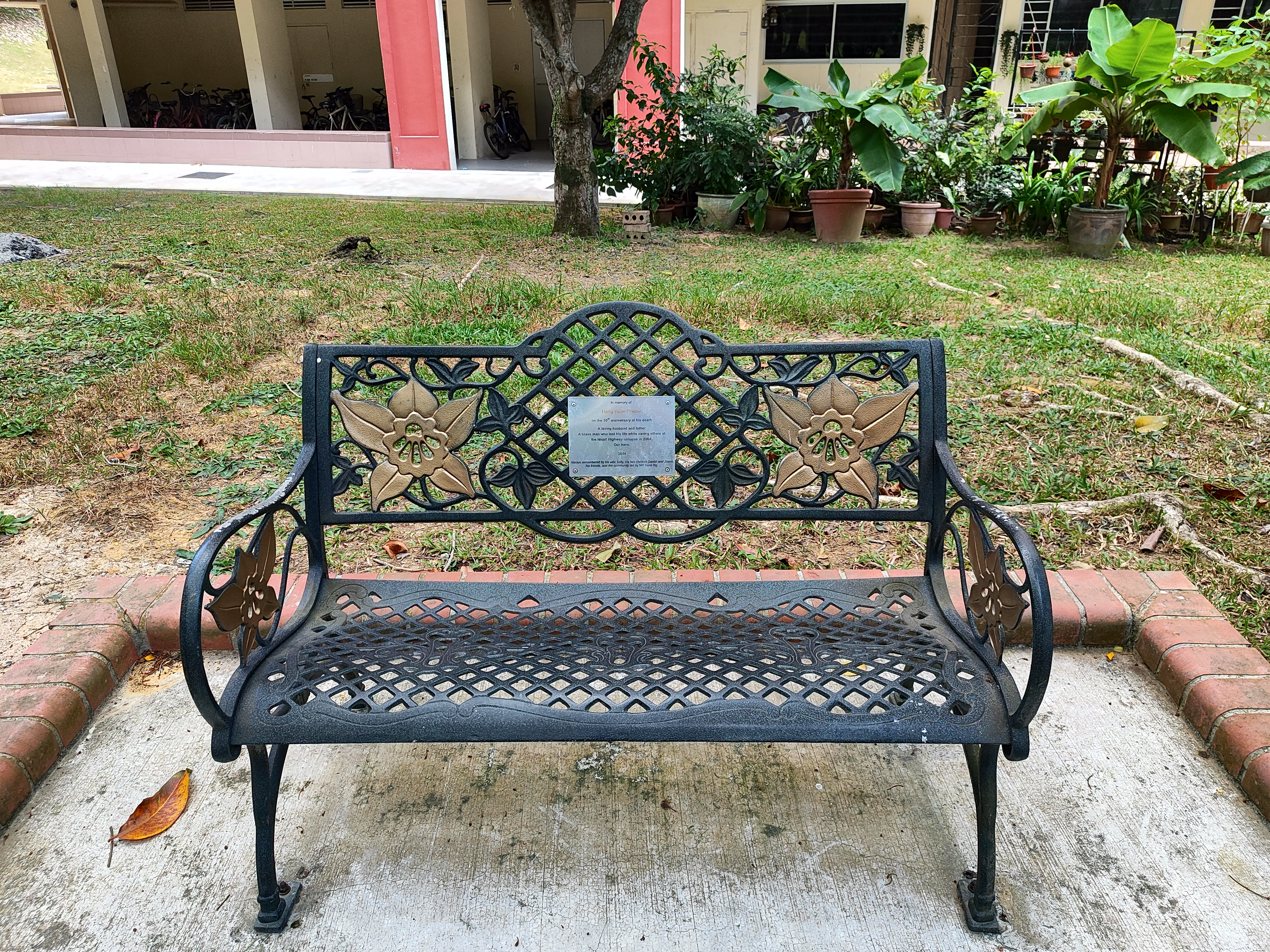
The memorial bench at Tampines Tree Park dedicated to Heng

Nine SCDF officers who were involved in the search and rescue efforts were awarded the Pingat Keberanian (Medal of Valour). SCDF Commissioner James Tan, who was in charge of the rescue team, was awarded the Pingat Pentadbiran Awam – Emas (Public Administration Medal – Gold) and 18 other SCDF officers were awarded other State medals. Heng was posthumously honoured with the Pingat Keberanian for prioritising the safety of his colleagues over his own escape in May 2004. In 2014, three former colleagues whom Heng rescued inaugurated a memorial bench at Tampines Tree Park dedicated to the foreman. The ceremony, initiated by MP Irene Ng, was attended by Heng's wife and his two children. The bench was funded by the Tampines Changkat Citizens' Consultative Committee. A commemorative stone and plaque were also erected at the former site marking where Heng was believed to be buried. On every anniversary, workers from Kori Construction visit the site to offer prayers and incense in honour of Heng.

=== Criminal trials ===
The COI determined that Nishimatsu, L&M Geotechnic, Monosys and thirteen professionals from the LTA and Nishimatsu were responsible for the collapse. Those who received warnings included Nishimatsu personnel, an LTA engineer, soil engineers, and L&M Geotechnic and Monosys, which were engaged in soil analysis. Three others were given counselling by the Manpower Ministry. Nishimatsu and three of its personnel faced criminal charges under the Factories Act. A qualified person from LTA, who was project director of the CCL and responsible for monitoring the site's readings, faced charges under the Building Control Act.

The CCL project director's trial began on 3 October 2005; he was found guilty and fined S$8,000 (US$6,000) on 24 November. On 28 April 2006, three senior executives from Nishimatsu were fined; the company's project director was fined S$120,000 (US$88,000) for his failure to take appropriate measures concerning the buckling walls and for compromising safety due to flawed monitoring of instruments. The company's design manager and project coordinator were each fined S$200,000 (US$100,000) for giving "blind approval" to the flawed designs.

=== Construction safety reforms ===
The LTA and the Building and Construction Authority (BCA) introduced new safety protocols such as a new Project Safety Review which identifies and reduces risks of hazards. Safety requirements are now set above industry standards, which include doubling scaffold access for evacuation routes in an emergency and one man-cage at each excavation area for rescuers. LTA no longer allows contractors to outsource their own geotechnical firms, but appoints an independent monitoring firm to check on instruments. Contractors are also no longer permitted to design and supervise their own temporary works, with the work carried out by independent consultants. Under the Safety Performance Scheme, contractors are now offered incentives or penalties and are required to maintain a Risk Register that identifies all hazards. The contractors and LTA meet every six months over safety performances, and identify and mitigate potential risks during the progress of works. These new regulations were reported to have driven up the costs of CCL construction works, alongside inflation and increasing costs of concrete. Prior to the Nicoll Highway Collapse, the LTA, along with the Housing and Development Board and JTC Corporation, supervised MRT projects. However, the Nicoll Highway Collapse inquiry panel was concerned with the conflict of interest between the Circle Line's supervisor and his role as the LTA's project director, who could be "more concerned with completing the project on time and within budget", according to Goh Chin Lian of The Straits Times. Thus, the LTA appointed Montgomery Watson Harza as the new supervisor for CCL Stage 3 and Parsons Brinckerhoff for Nicoll Highway station.

=== Highway reinstatement ===
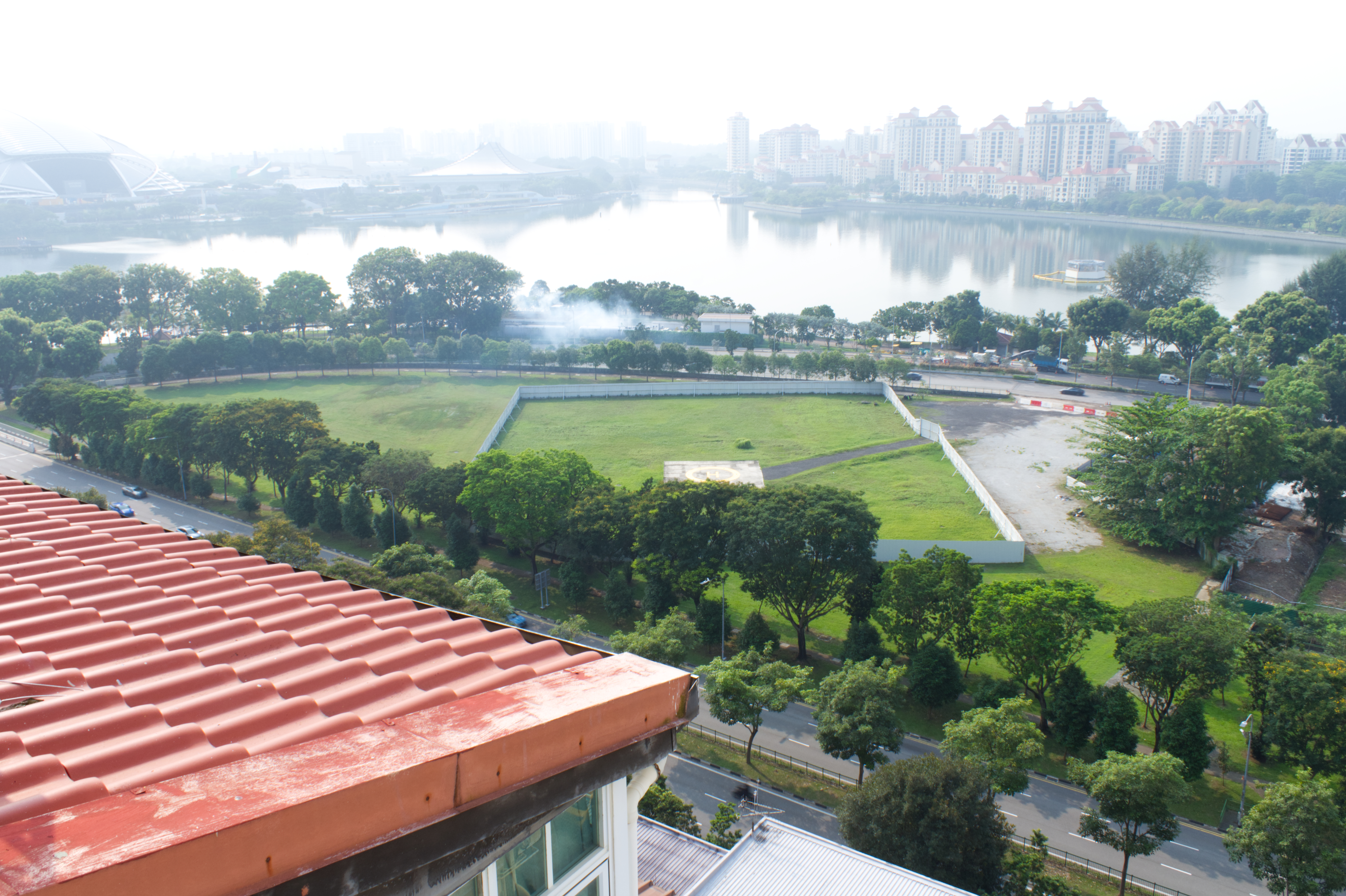
The site of the collapse, now backfilled

Following the collapse, the LTA closed off the stretch of Nicoll Highway from Middle Road to Mountbatten Road. Alternative roads leading into the city, including the junction of Kallang Road and Crawford Street, were widened to accommodate diverted traffic. The LTA also converted a bus-only lane at Lorong 1 Geylang towards Mountbatten Road into a traffic lane. On 25 April 2004, a part of Nicoll Highway running from Mountbatten Road to Stadium Drive was restored for motorists accessing the area around National Stadium of Singapore. Crawford Underpass, which runs under Merdeka Bridge, reopened on 29 April.

After the collapsed site was refilled, the highway was rebuilt on bored piles so the rebuilt stretch would not be affected by future excavation works. Reconstruction of the highway began on 24 August 2004 and the new stretch of highway reopened on 4 December.

=== Station relocation and opening ===
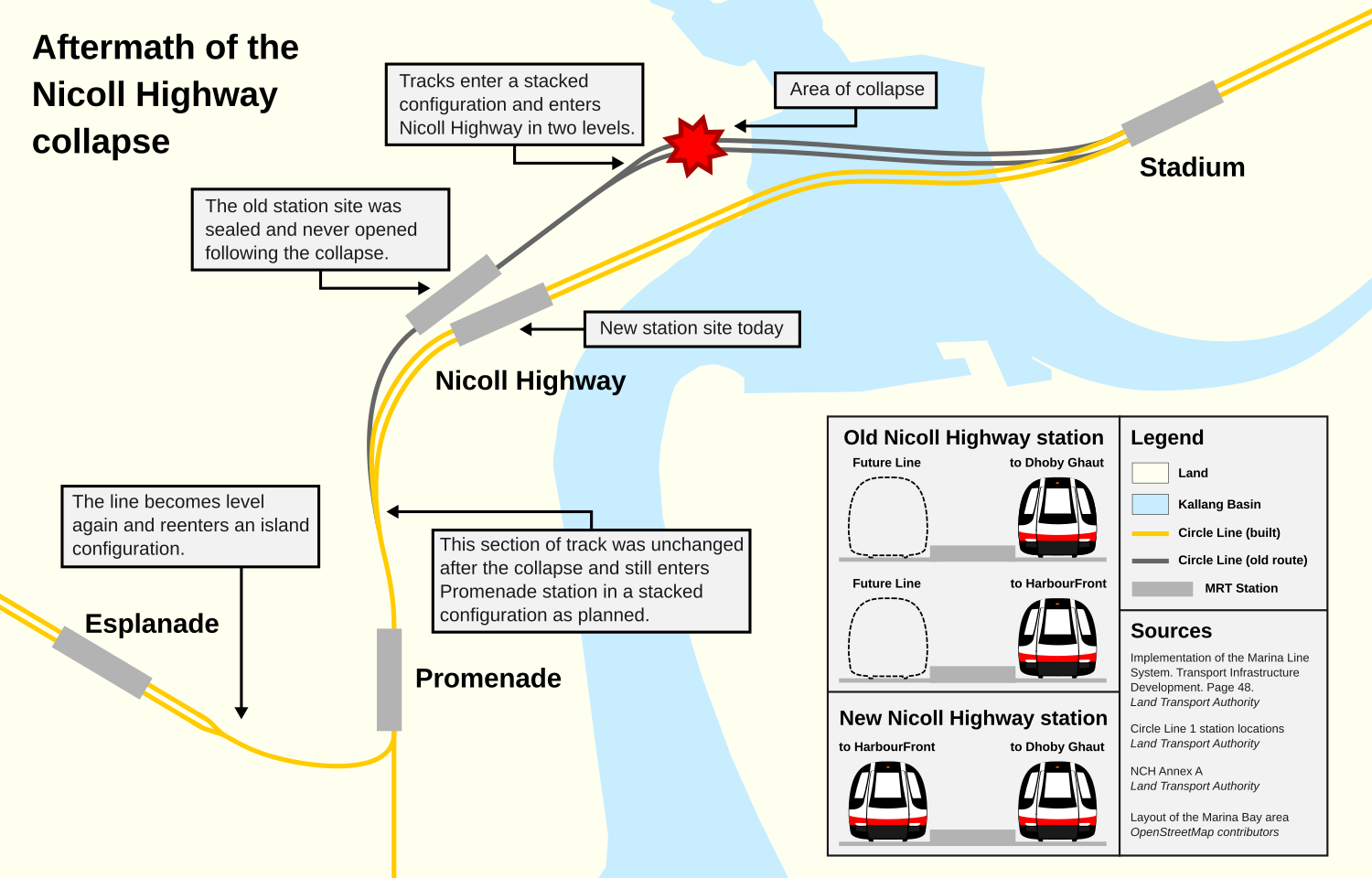
The relocated station and realigned tunnels

On 4 February 2005, the LTA announced Nicoll Highway station would be relocated 100 m (330 ft) south of the original site along Republic Avenue with a new tunnel alignment between Millenia (now Promenade) and Boulevard (now Stadium) stations. The LTA decided against rebuilding at the original site due to higher costs and engineering challenges posed by debris left there. Prior to the collapse, Nicoll Highway and the adjacent Promenade station were planned to have a cross-platform interchange with an unspecified future line; that had to be realigned because the new Nicoll Highway station had no provision to be an interchange. The new tunnels were designed by Aecom consultants and tunnels to the previous site were demolished with special machinery from Japan.

The new station was built using the top-down method while the 1.8 km (1.1 miles) of tunnels were bored, minimising their impact on the environment. Retaining walls for the new station site were 1.5 m (4.9 ft) thick and entrenched 60 m (200 ft) underground – twice the previous depth. To reduce ground movement, the walls would be embedded into hard layers of soil. To ensure stability and prevent movement of the bored tunnels, the contractor implemented perforated vertical drains, and ground improvement efforts were undertaken in the vicinity of tunnel drainage sumps and cross-passages.

On 29 September 2005, the LTA marked the start of the new Nicoll Highway station's construction with a groundbreaking ceremony, during which the diaphragm walls were first installed. Due to the tunnel collapse, the completion date of CCL Stage 1 was initially delayed from 2007 to 2009, and further postponed until 2010. Nicoll Highway station opened on 17 April 2010, along with the stations on CCL Stages 1 and 2.
