= Nicoll Highway MRT station =

Mass Rapid Transit station in Singapore

Nicoll Highway CC5 尼诰大道 நிக்கல் நெடுஞ்சாலை
- Platform level of Nicoll Highway MRT station

General information
- Location: 20 Republic Avenue, Singapore 038970
- Coordinates: 01°17′59″N 103°51′49″E
- System: Mass Rapid Transit (MRT) station
- Owner: Land Transport Authority
- Operator: SMRT Trains
- Line: Circle Line
- Platforms: 2 (1 island platform)
- Tracks: 2
- Connections: Bus, Taxi

Construction
- Structure type: Underground
- Depth: 21.5 metres (71 ft)
- Platform levels: 1
- Parking: Yes (Golden Mile Complex)
- Cycle facilities: Yes
- Accessible: Yes

Other information
- Station code: NCH

History
- Opened: 17 April 2010; 16 years ago
- Former names: Kampong Glam, Sultan Gate

Passengers
- June 2024: 4,521 per day

Services
Preceding station	Mass Rapid Transit	Following station
Promenade Clockwise	Circle Line	Stadium Anticlockwise
Promenade towards Dhoby Ghaut	Circle Line	Stadium towards Prince Edward Road
Track layout
Location
- Location within Singapore Rail central area

Nicoll Highway MRT station is an underground Mass Rapid Transit (MRT) station on the Circle Line (CCL) in Singapore. Located in the Downtown Core underneath Republic Avenue near the Kallang River, the station serves commercial and residential developments along Nicoll Highway, such as the Golden Mile Complex and The Concourse. The station is operated by SMRT Trains.

First announced as part of the Marina MRT line in 1999, the station was incorporated into Stage 1 of the CCL in 2001. During the construction, the tunnels linking to the original station site caved in along with the highway on 20 April 2004, killing four people. Following an investigation, which found human error and organisational failures as causes of the collapse, the station was relocated. Alongside the other stations on Stages 1 and 2 of the CCL, the station opened on 17 April 2010.

Designed by Ong & Ong, the station is 21.5 m (71 ft) deep and has a black and grey scheme. One of the two station entrances is linked to an overhead bridge. Nicoll Highway station features a public artwork Re-claiming the Peripherals by Khiew Huey Chian, consisting of four reliefs depicting wild plants.

== History ==
Nicoll Highway station was first announced in November 1999 as part of the Mass Rapid Transit's Marina line (MRL), which consisted of six stations from the Dhoby Ghaut to Stadium station. In 2001, the station became part of Circle Line (CCL) Stage 1 when the MRL was incorporated into the CCL. The contract for the construction of Nicoll Highway station and tunnels was awarded to a joint venture between Nishimatsu Construction Co Ltd and Lum Chang Building Contractors Pte Ltd at S$270 million (US$150.7 million) on 31 May 2001.

Starting on 16 March 2002, a section of the Nicoll Highway from Ophir Road to Merdeka Bridge had to be temporarily diverted for the station's construction, with the bus stops shifted accordingly. An overhead bridge was constructed so that pedestrians could cross over the highway between the bus stops and The Concourse.

=== Tunnel collapse ===
The tunnels linking to the station caved in along with a 100 m (330 ft) stretch of the Nicoll Highway on 20 April 2004. The collapse of a tunnel retaining wall caused soil subsidence, creating a hole 100 metres long, 130 metres wide, and 30 metres deep (328 by 427 by 98 ft). Four people were killed and three were injured. While the Singapore Civil Defence Force (SCDF) managed to recover three bodies, the search for the last victim's body had to be called off two days after the incident owing to the unstable condition of the collapsed area, and his body was never found.

Safety measures were implemented after the collapse to minimise further damage to the collapsed area. A damaged canal had to be blocked to prevent any water from the Kallang River from entering the site, while canvas sheets were laid on slopes to protect the soil. Meanwhile, the surrounding buildings were monitored for stability with additional settlement markers and electro-level beams installed at the nearby Golden Mile Complex. The Land Transport Authority (LTA) halted work at 16 of the 24 CCL excavation sites so these could be reviewed.

The collapsed site was quickly stabilised through the injection of concrete into areas vulnerable to movement or further collapse. Several vehicles, equipment and construction materials were retrieved using a crane. The remaining equipment and material at the site were buried in place to avoid risking further collapse. Access to the collapsed site via the completed parts of the tunnel and the shaft was sealed off. After the site was refilled, the Nicoll Highway was rebuilt on bored piles so the new highway would not be affected by future excavation works. Reconstruction of the highway began on 24 August 2004; the new highway reopened on 4 December.

An investigation report by a Committee of Inquiry (COI) concluded that the incident could have been prevented and was caused by human error and organisational failures. The strut-waler support system was poorly designed and was weaker than it should have been, while there was a lack of monitoring and proper management of data. Although the LTA initially insisted that the collapse happened without warning, the COI report revealed that there were already "warning signs", such as excessive wall deflections and surging inclinometer readings, which were not addressed seriously. The report added that there was a lack of safety culture at the site and made several recommendations to improve the safety of construction projects, which the government accepted.

=== Relocation and opening ===
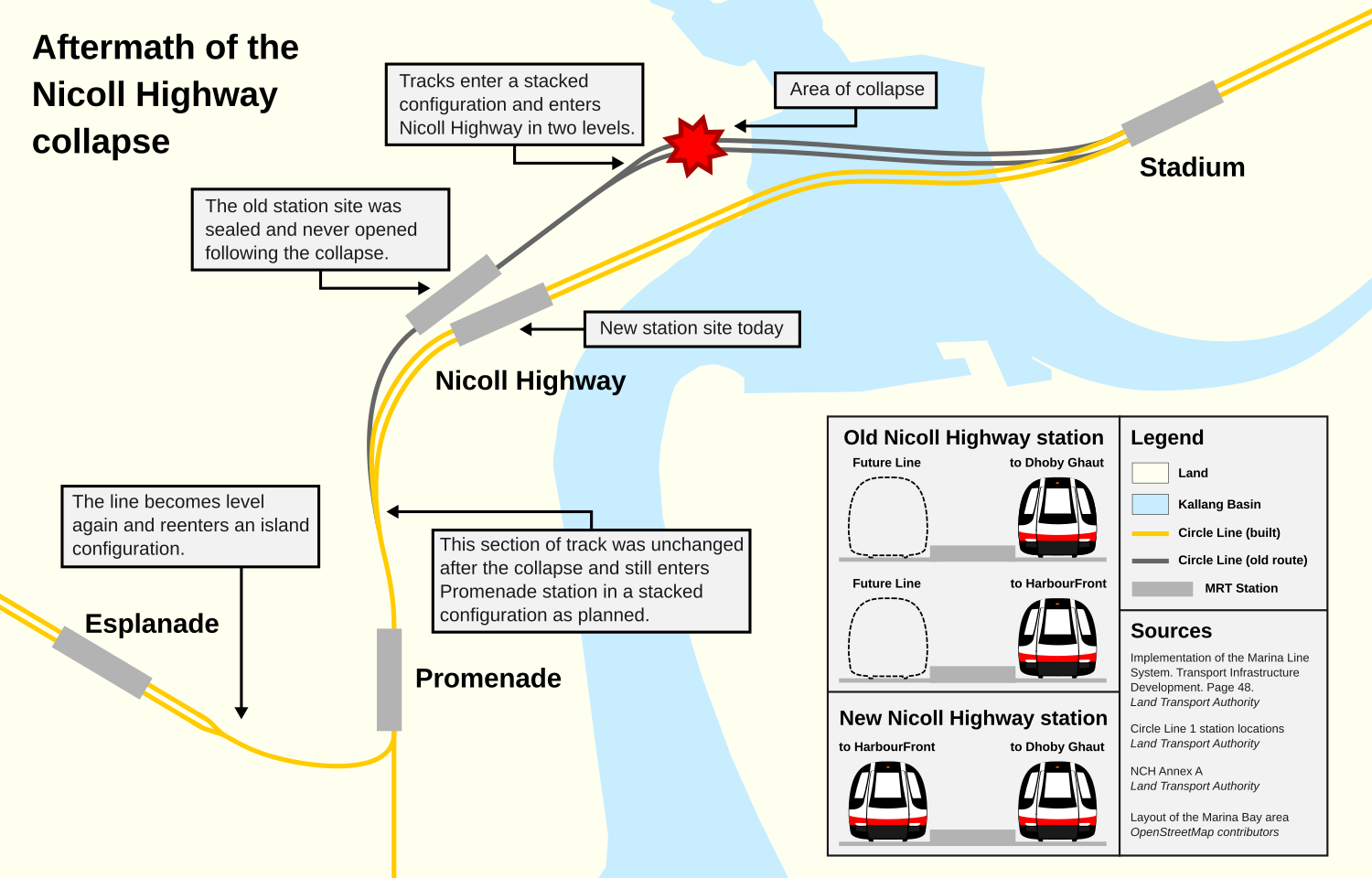
The relocated station and realigned tunnels

On 4 February 2005, the LTA announced that the station would be relocated 100 m (330 ft) south of the original site along Republic Avenue, with a new tunnel alignment between the Millenia (now Promenade) and Boulevard (now Stadium) stations. The LTA decided against rebuilding at the original site due to higher costs and engineering challenges posed by debris left at the original site. The new tunnels were designed by Aecom consultants, while the former tunnels to the previous site were crushed with special machinery from Japan.

The new station was built using a top-down method while the 1.8 km (1.1 miles) of tunnels were bored through, minimising the impact on the environment. The retaining walls for the new station site are 1.5 m (4.9 ft) thick and entrenched 60 m (200 ft) underground—twice the previous depth. To reduce ground movement, the walls were embedded into hard layers of soil. To ensure stability and prevent movement of the bored tunnels, the contractor installed perforated vertical drains, with ground improvement efforts undertaken in the vicinity of tunnel drainage sumps and cross-passages.

On 29 September 2005, the LTA marked the start of the new station's construction with a groundbreaking ceremony, during which the diaphragm walls were first installed. Due to the tunnels' collapse, the completion date of CCL Stage 1 was delayed from 2007 to 2009, and later pushed further to 2010. On 26 January 2010, Raymond Lim, the transport minister, announced that the station, together with the rest of CCL Stages 1 and 2, would begin operations on 17 April that year. Prior to the station's opening, passengers were offered a preview of the station during the CCL Discovery open house on 4 April.

== Station details ==
=== Name and location ===
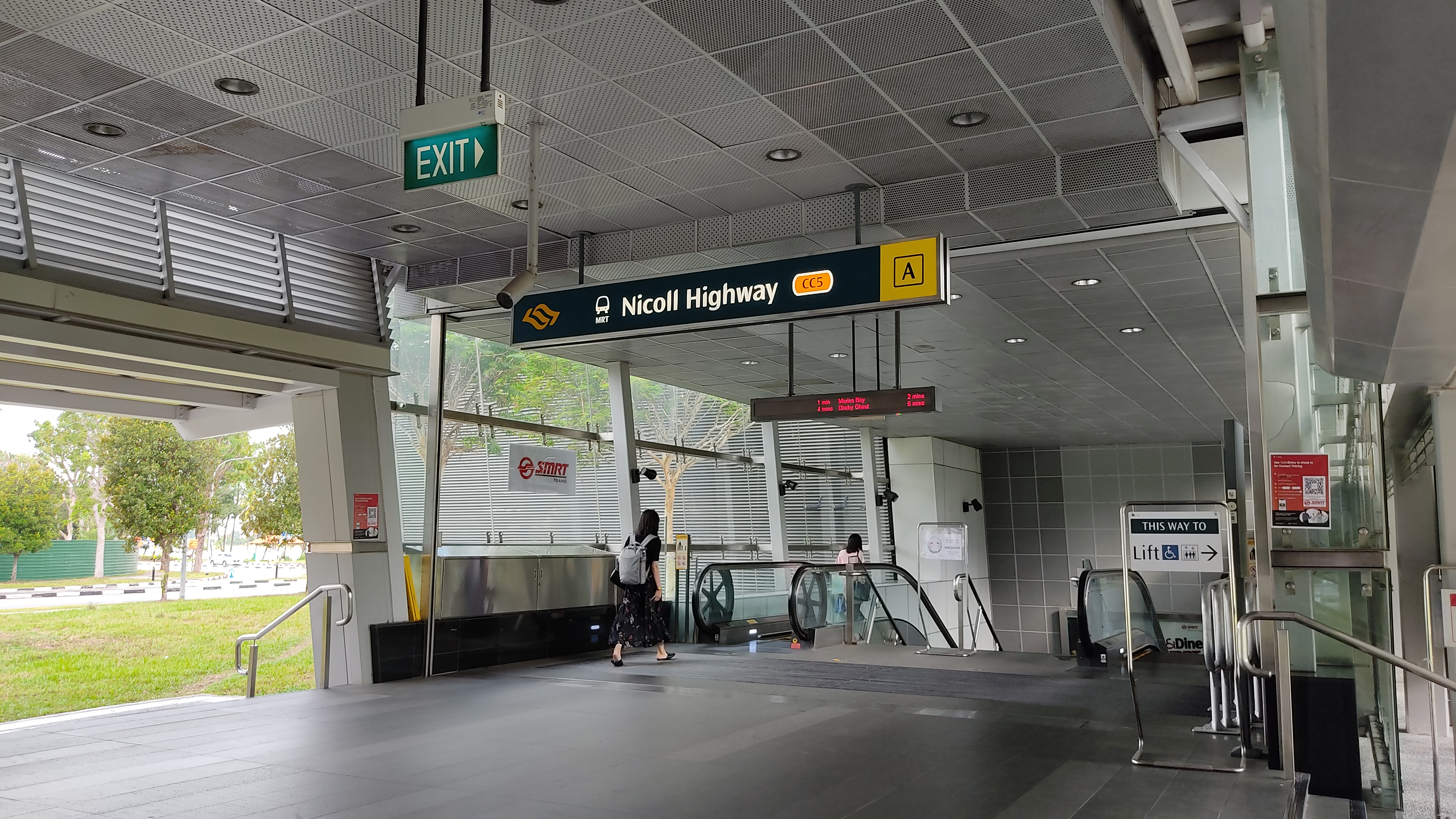
Exit A of the station

As the name suggests, the station is located near Nicoll Highway underneath Republic Avenue, in the Central Region of Singapore. The name of the station was also its working name. In an LTA naming poll, two other names for the station, Kampong Glam and Sultan Gate, were shortlisted. While these names were intended to reflect the history and heritage of the area, they were considered unsuitable for the relocated station. With strong public support, the station retained its working name.

Surrounding developments include Golden Mile Tower, Golden Sultan Plaza, The Concourse and The Plaza. The station is located on the west bank of the Kallang Basin and near the Kallang River, where the Kallang Water Sports Centre and Marina Promenade Park are situated. The station also serves the Hajjah Fatimah Mosque.

=== Services ===
Nicoll Highway station serves the CCL and is situated between Promenade and Stadium stations. The official station code is CC5. Being part of the CCL, the station is operated by SMRT Trains. Prior to the collapse, there were plans for the station, along with the adjacent Promenade station, to have a cross-platform interchange with an unspecified future line; (Note: The Circle Line: Linking All Lines by Colin Cheong states that it was proposed for the station to be the terminus of the Bukit Timah line, now the second stage of the Downtown line.) that had to be realigned as the new station did not have such provisions to be an interchange. The new tunnels were designed by Aecom consultants and tunnels to the previous site were demolished with special machinery from Japan. The station operates between 5:45 am and 12:17 am, with trains running every 5 to 7 minutes in both directions daily.

=== Design ===
The two-level underground station is 165 m (541 ft) long and the platforms are 21.5 m (71 ft) deep. Designed by ONG & ONG, the station has a colour scheme of black, grey and white. The platform's dark, polished seats were intended to complement the rest of the station's modern design. The station has two exits, with Exit A connecting to The Concourse via an overhead pedestrian bridge. The station architecture is intended to represent the "technological sophistication" of the MRT network.

The station is wheelchair accessible. A tactile system, consisting of tiles with rounded or elongated raised studs, guides visually impaired commuters through the station, with dedicated tactile routes that connect the station entrances to the platforms. Wider fare gates allow easier access for wheelchair users into the station.

=== Station artwork ===
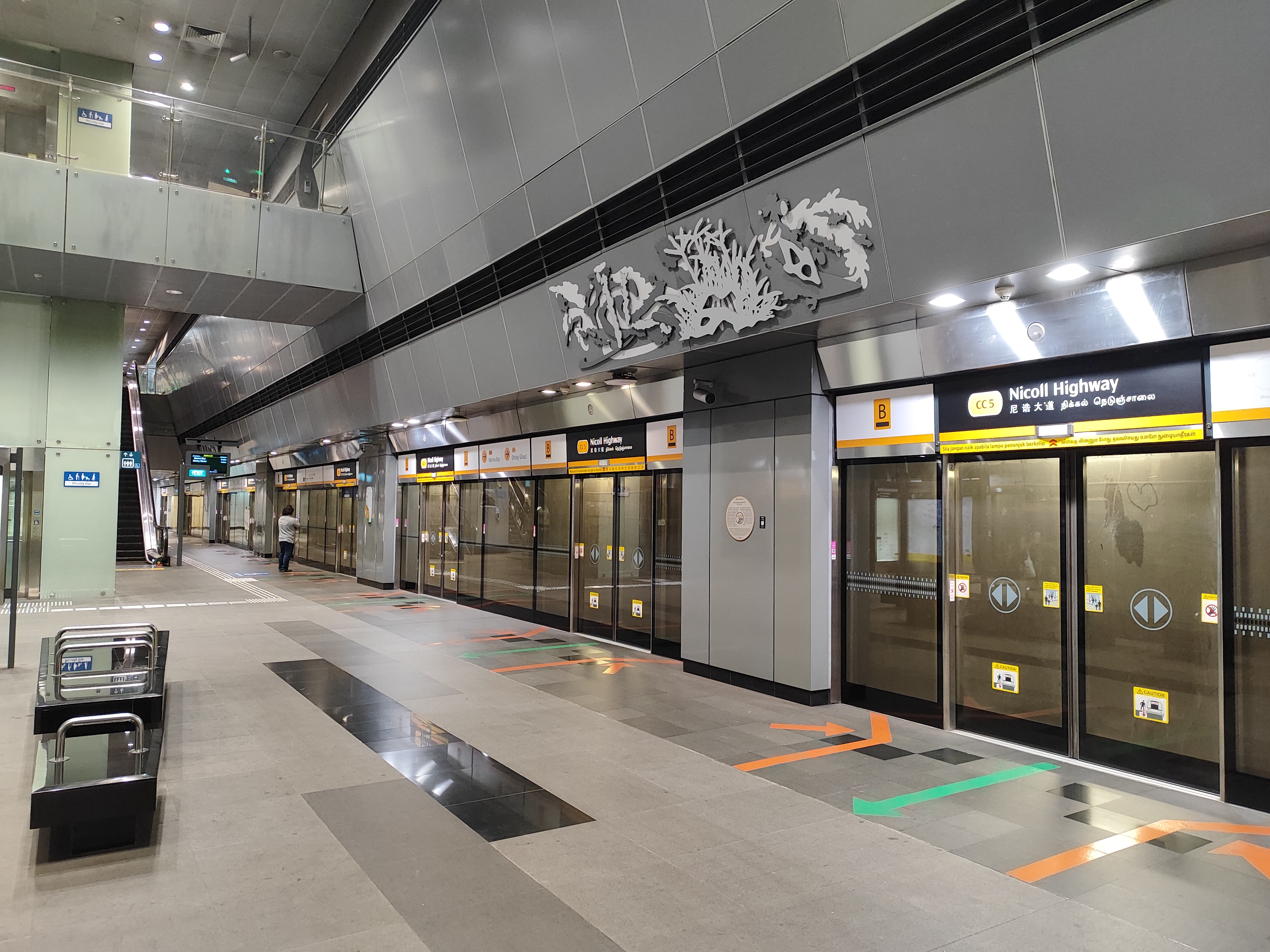
One of the reliefs above the platform screen doors of Platform B of the station

The station features Khiew Huey Chian's artwork Re-claiming the Peripherals as part of the Art-in-Transit programme – a public art showcase that integrates artworks into the MRT network. The artwork consists of four 6 by 1 m (19.7 by 3.3 ft) reliefs displayed over the platform doors, depicting often-overlooked wild plants in various shapes and formations. These plants had been crucial in preventing soil erosion of the reclaimed land on which the station is presently located, and had also left a deep impression on Khiew during his youth. He sought to showcase their importance by depicting the site's early beginnings before development of the area.

The work was intended to be in shades of white, but this colour was associated with death, so it was changed to grey. The Art Review Panel was concerned that the work would reference the Nicoll Highway collapse. Keeping the ambiguity of the artwork, the new colour complements the grey scheme of the station architecture. During the artwork's production, there were concerns over the uneven backing of the material, which caused the colour shading to not "come out right". With Khiew's closer involvement in the production process, this problem was later resolved. The station architects were concerned that the "pretty" figures would clash with the station's futuristic architecture, but Khiew felt that the contrast emphasised his intention of capturing the commuter's attention. It was initially intended for his work to be spread across the platforms' entire length above the screen doors to represent the highway. However, this idea would have hindered maintenance works for the cables running above the doors. Hence, the work was limited to four places above the platforms, which Khiew took as a challenge to "communicate with less". Khiew hoped that commuters would gain different perspectives from his work while encouraging them to be open-minded.

== See also ==
- Safety on the Mass Rapid Transit (Singapore)

== Notes and references ==
=== Bibliography ===
- Zhuang, Justin (2013). Art in Transit: Circle Line MRT. Singapore: Land Transport Authority. ISBN 978-981-07-4982-8. OCLC 854958677.
- Cheong, Colin (2012). The Circle Line: Linking All Lines (PDF). Singapore: Land Transport Authority. ISBN 978-981-4342-02-5.
