= Marina Promenade, Singapore =

Park in Singapore

Marina Promenade
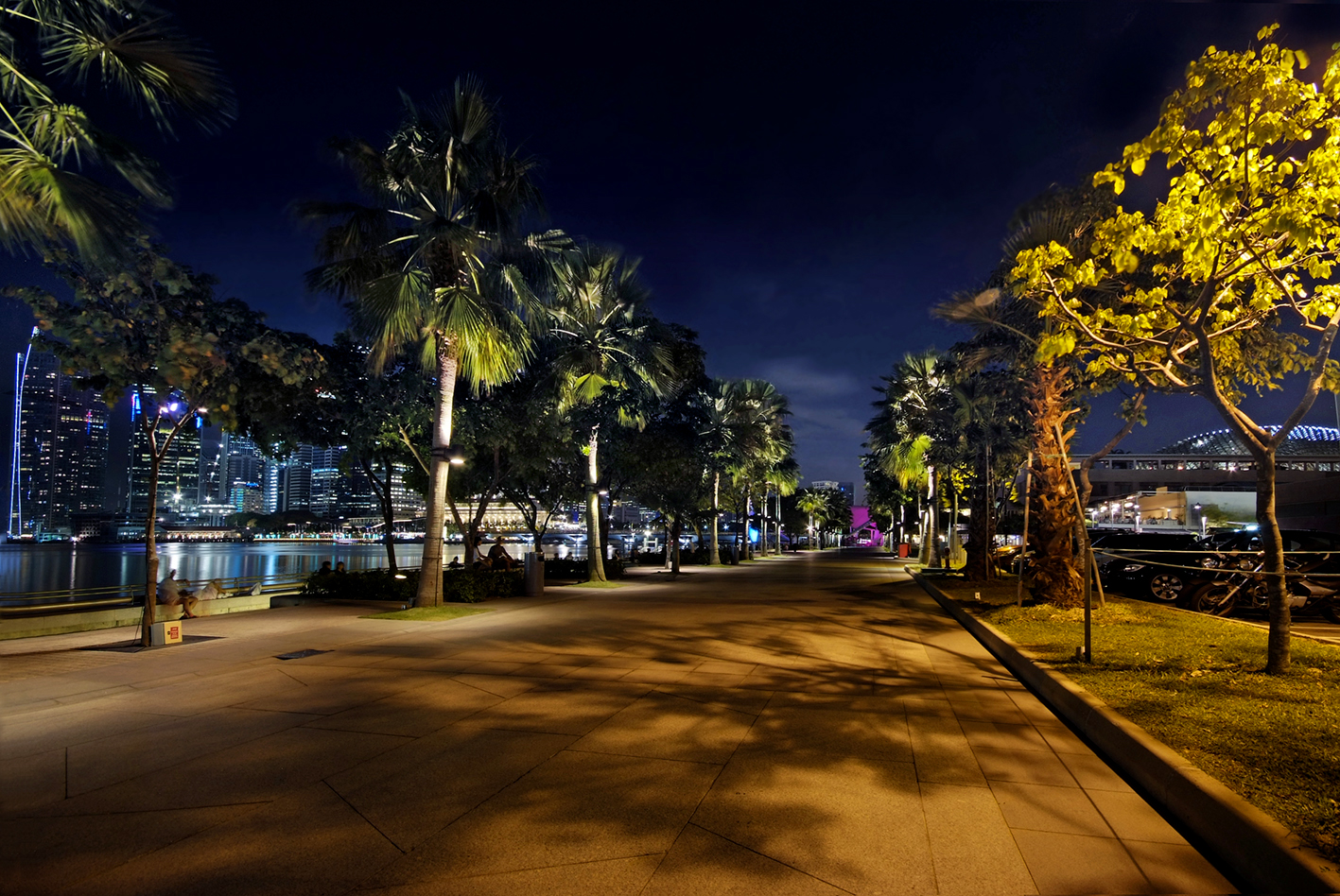
- A night view of Marina Promenade
- Interactive map of Marina Promenade
- Location: Singapore
- Coordinates: 1.288°N 103.873°E
- Status: Open

Marina Promenade is a park in Singapore that links Kallang Riverside Park in the north to Esplanade - Theatres on the Bay in the south. The entire park is situated on the western bank of the Kallang Basin and Marina Channel, along Republic Avenue and Republic Boulevard. Notable landmarks along the park include the Merdeka Bridge, the Benjamin Sheares Bridge, the Singapore Flyer and the Helix Bridge.

Marina Promenade extends across two planning areas in the Central Region of Singapore: Kallang and Downtown Core.

Marina Promenade provides excellent scenery of the Singapore skyline, the Singapore Sports Hub as well as the Marina Bay Sands. The park is in close proximity to Promenade and Nicoll Highway MRT stations.
