= Beach Road, Singapore =

Road in Singapore

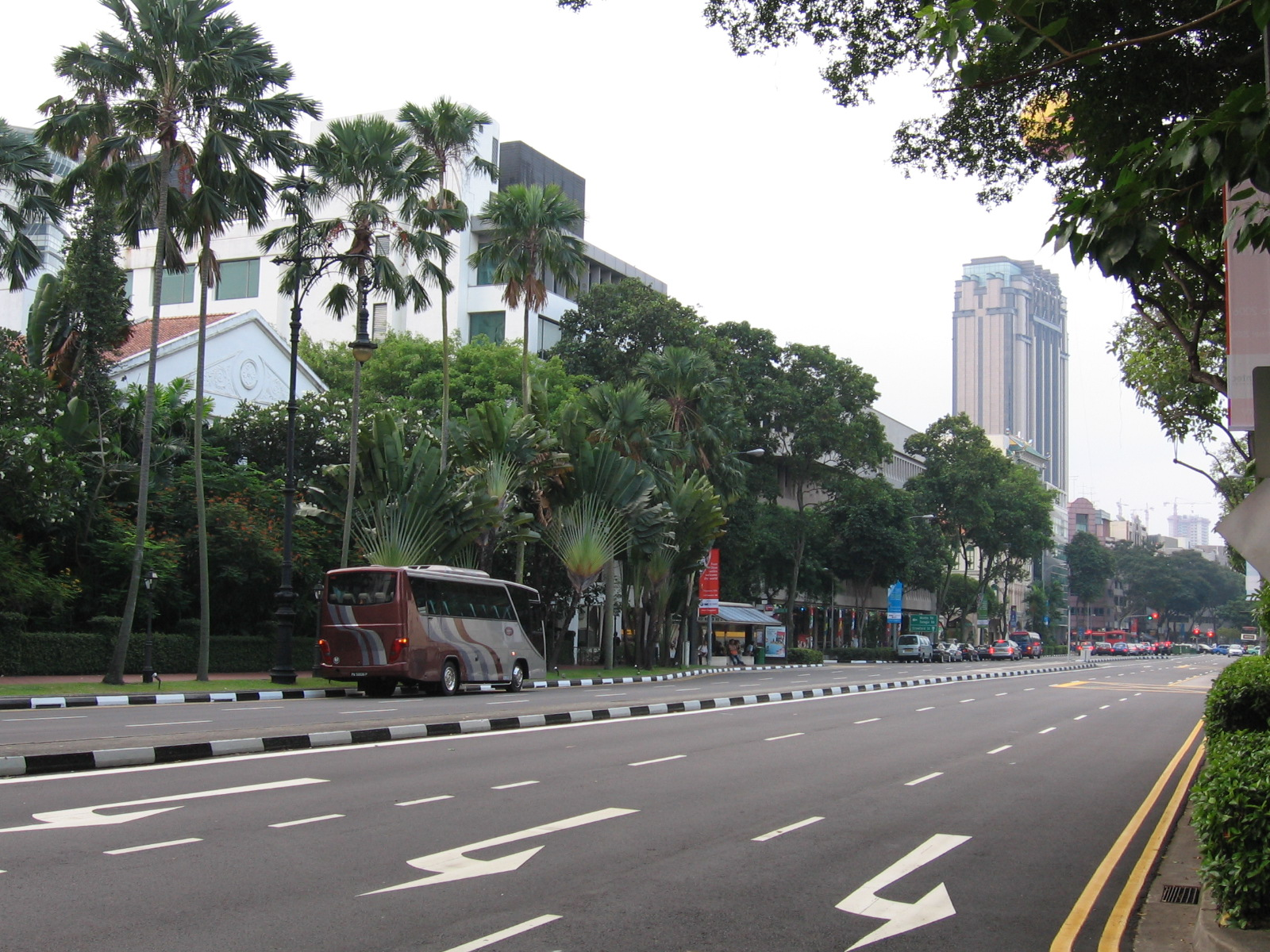
Beach Road near Raffles Hotel

Beach Road is a road located within the planning areas of Kallang, Rochor and the Downtown Core in Singapore.

The road starts at its junction with Crawford Street in Kallang in the north, runs in a generally southerly direction, enters the Downtown Core at its junction with Ophir Road, and ends at its junction with Stamford Road and St. Andrew's Road to the south.

As its name implies, Beach Road used to run along Singapore's southern coast, before land reclamation took place in the Kallang Basin area.

== Landmarks ==
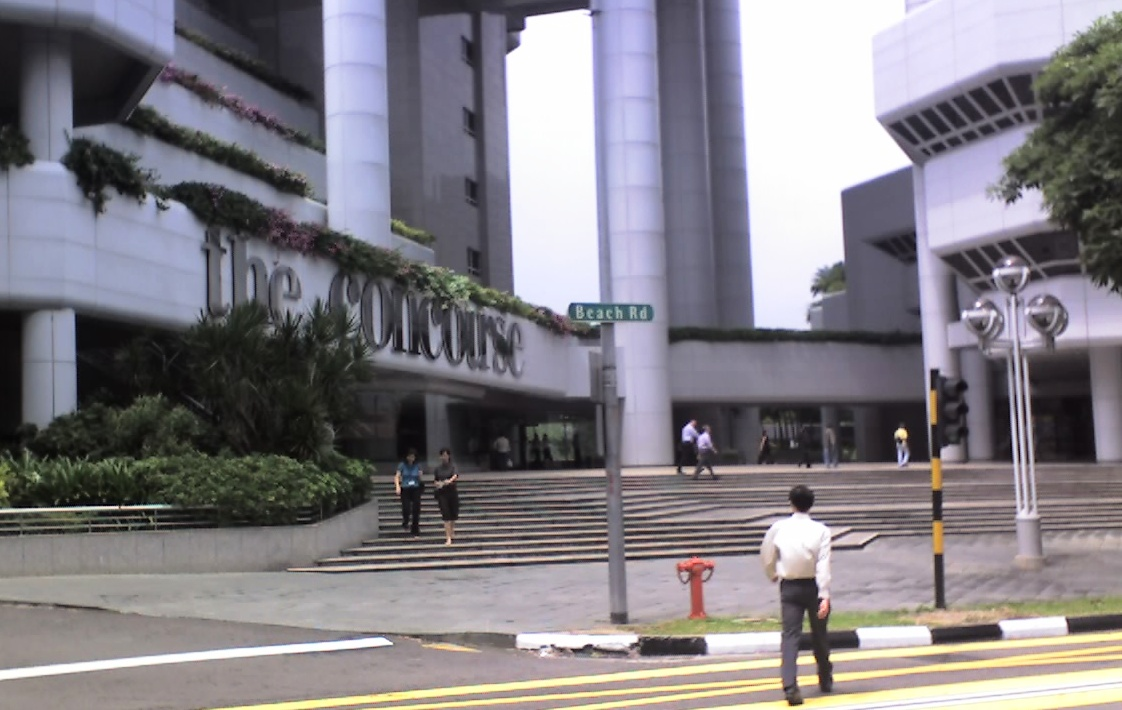
The Concourse

The prominent landmarks located along Beach Road include (from north to south):

- South Beach Residences, Mixed Development with Grade A offices, hotel and residential component
- DUO, a contemporary twin-tower integrated development comprising residences, offices, a 5-star hotel and retail gallery
- Golden Mile Complex and Golden Mile Tower
- Destination Singapore Beach Road
- Golden Mile Food Centre
- Masjid Hajjah Fatimah
- Saint John Headquarters
- The Concourse
- Parkroyal on Beach Road
- The Plaza
- The Gateway
- Shaw Tower
- Old Beach Road Police Station
- South Beach
- Raffles Hotel
- Civilian War Memorial and War Memorial Park
- Raffles City with Swissôtel The Stamford and Fairmont Singapore

Les Garçons Singapore
