= Cheong Eak Chong =

Chinese businessman

- 鍾奕莊
- Born: 1888; Anxi County, Quanzhou, Fujian, Qing China
- Died: 13 February 1984 (aged 95)
- Known for: Real estate business
- Title: Chairman of the Hong Fok Corporation
- Spouse(s): Lim Kiam, Lim Ghee, Lim Poay
- Children: 28

Cheong Eak Chong
- Traditional Chinese: 鍾奕莊
- Simplified Chinese: 钟奕庄
Transcriptions
Standard Mandarin
- Hanyu Pinyin: Zhōng Yìzhuāng
Yue: Cantonese
- Yale Romanization: Jūng Yihkjōng
Southern Min
- Hokkien POJ: Chiong E̍k-chng

Zhong Mingxuan
- Traditional Chinese: 鍾銘選
- Simplified Chinese: 钟铭选
Transcriptions
Standard Mandarin
- Hanyu Pinyin: Zhōng Míngxuǎn
Yue: Cantonese
- Yale Romanization: Jūng Mìhngsyún
Southern Min
- Hokkien POJ: Chiong Bêng-sóan

Cheong Eak Chong (Chinese: 钟奕庄; pinyin: Zhōng Yìzhuāng; 1888 – 13 February 1984) was a Chinese businessman of She ethnicity. He was born in Anxi County in Fujian in 1888, but left China in 1921 for Singapore. He began his business career there as a goldsmith, later diversifying into finance and opening a bank with offices in Hong Kong and focused his investments in the real estate and tourism industries in Singapore and Hong Kong, establishing a property empire whose eventual flagship was the Hong Fok Corporation. Throughout his career, Cheong contributed to poverty relief and development in his home county of Anxi, and he is commemorated in the names of a number of public institutions in Fujian.

== Life and business career ==
Born in 1888 in Anxi County, Fujian, Cheong Eak Chong emigrated to Singapore in 1921. He founded a jewellery firm there in 1925, and subsequently organized a bank with his cousin, sending his eldest son to open an office in Shanghai. The political turbulence in China from the 1940s on led Cheong to focus on his interests in Singapore and Hong Kong, where he diversified into real estate, property development, and tourism. He founded a real estate firm in Singapore, Yat Yuen Hong Holdings, in the 1950s, which he reorganized into the Hong Fok Corporation in 1977. Among other properties in Singapore, he developed International Plaza, The Concourse and the Grand Hyatt.

== Charity in Fujian ==
Cheong sent back a significant amount of his earnings to China, financing the development of Anxi County and South Fujian: in 1946, he co-funded the establishment of a public hospital there, now named Mingxuan Hospital, and after the founding of the People's Republic of China in 1949 he invested in transport infrastructure in the county. Cheong also organized famine relief in the county, securing supplies of flour, rice, and cooking oil. Mingxuan High School in Quanzhou, which has supplied cadets for the People's Liberation Army Air Force, including a fighter pilot on the Liaoning carrier, is named after him.

== Family and successors ==
Cheong had three wives and a total of 28 children, 16 sons and 12 daughters, who were split between Singapore and Hong Kong. His children were responsible for the development of numerous properties in Hong Kong and Singapore; in Hong Kong, his eldest two sons Kung-hai (鍾江海) and Ming-fai (鍾明輝) became known as the "Kings of Industrial Buildings". Cheong died on 13 February 1984. He chaired the Hong Fok Corporation until his death, and was succeeded in the post by another son, Kim Pong (鍾金榜). Cheong Kung-hai's grandson, Derek Cheung (鍾培生), is the founder of HKEsport, the first professional esports team of Hong Kong.

== See also ==
- Aw Boon Haw: Chinese Businessman from Fujian.
