= The Concourse =

Mixed-use skyscraper in Singapore

- 鸿福中心
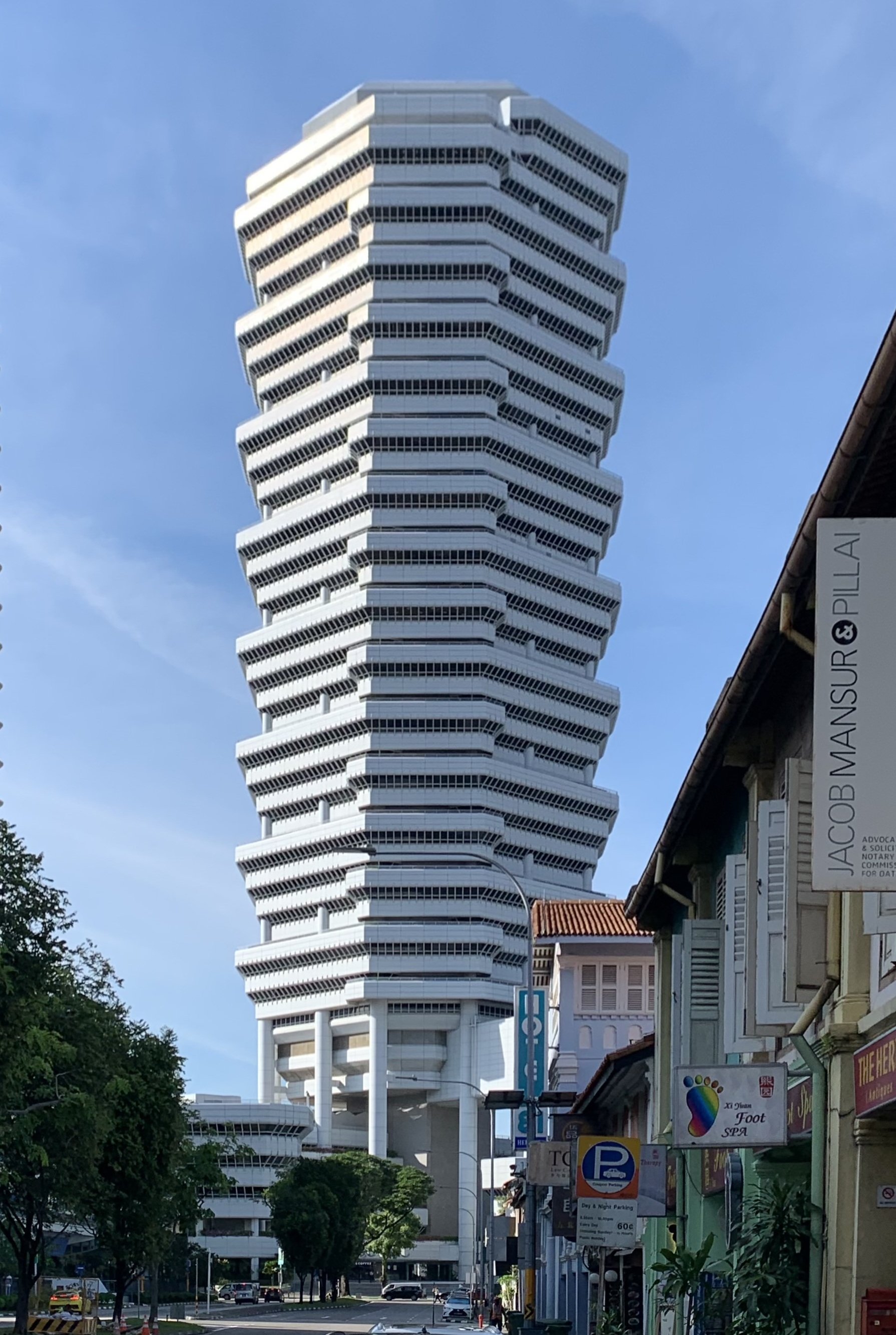
- Interactive map of the The Concourse area

General information
- Status: Completed
- Type: Commercial and Residential
- Architectural style: High-rise
- Location: 300 Beach Road, Singapore 199555
- Coordinates: 1°18′03.8″N 103°51′43.8″E
- Owner: Hong Fok Land
- Management: Hong Fok Land

Technical details
- Floor count: 41

Website
- The Concourse

The Concourse (simplified Chinese: 鸿福中心; traditional Chinese: 鴻福中心; pinyin: Hóngfú zhōngxīn) is a post-modern high-rise commercial and residential building on Beach Road Kallang, Singapore opposite Nicoll Highway MRT station. The Concourse is located in Singapore's "Golden Mile", which refers to the strip of land between Nicoll Highway and Beach Road. It was planned by the Singapore Government as a high-rise spine fronting Kallang Basin. The area used to be occupied by squatters and small marine industries.

The Concourse's site was acquired in competition in the Urban Redevelopment Authority's 8th Sales of Sites programme in 1979. A project, developed by Cheong Eak Chong's Hong Fok Corporation, commenced in 1981 as the Hong Fok Centre but construction stopped when Singapore's economy was hit by a recession in the mid-1980s.

In 1987, the architectural firm Architects 61 and architect Paul Rudolph re-designed the complex. They retained what was already constructed, and revamped the remainder in order to accommodate new programmatic requirements.

Built at a cost of S$248.1 million and to a height of 175 metres (574 ft) for its office tower, The Concourse was completed on 5 February 1994.

== Architecture ==
The Concourse is a mixed-use development, comprising a 41-story office tower, a three-level retail podium and nine storeys of serviced apartments. The three distinct components, with their different usage, have separate entrances. These overlook the traditional low-rise shophouses and office blocks in the Beach Road area.

Paul Rudolph designed The Concourse as a "Tropical Skyscraper". His use of solar shading, wide overhangs, and communal gardens and external balconies has some similarities with the ideas advanced by Ken Yeang for the bioclimatic skyscraper. The correlation between form and function arises out of Rudolph's grounding in modern architecture, for he was taught by Walter Gropius at Harvard University.

Approaching the city from Singapore Changi Airport, The Concourse's tower stands out as a landmark because of its distinctive silhouette when viewed from across the Kallang Basin. The tower is octagonal in plan, as the number "8" for the octagon is associated with prosperity in Chinese culture, and is typical of Paul Rudolph's buildings. It is also supported by huge pilotis, a feature that is shared with The Colonnade in Singapore. The distinctive soaring effect of the tower is accentuated by these lofty columns on the first storey which also effectively elevate the building, but is mitigated by the faceted façade of the serviced apartments and retail podium.

The Concourse's most prominent architectural feature is the aluminium curtain wall system incorporating inclined windows that form clusters of units. These interlocking clusters are stacked vertically, like dinner plates, one above the other, rotating around the building.

A five-storey atrium lobby greets visitors to The Concourse, and 14 sky-atria within the tower form reception lobbies for multinational corporations and organisations. The serviced apartment units in the lower block vary in size, and facilities include a swimming pool, squash courts and a fitness centre. The apartments overlook Nicoll Highway and the Kallang River Basin. Shops are arranged around a three-storey sky-lit atrium in the retail podium.

Due to its unique and unconventional building design, a scale model of The Concourse once went for an architectural exhibition tour around the world.

== Gallery ==
Early design for The Concourse, circa 1979–1981.

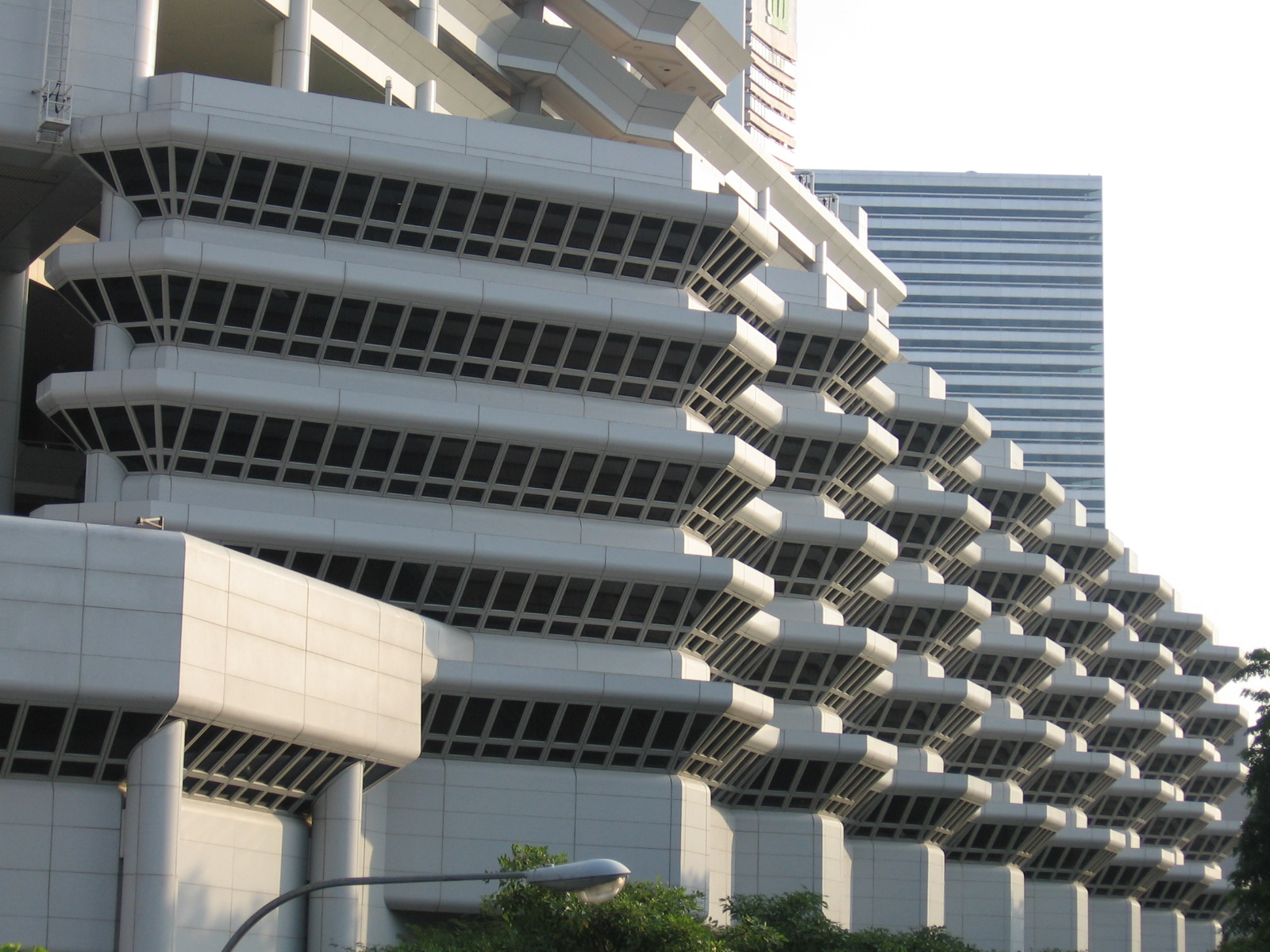
The Concourse's aluminium curtain wall system.

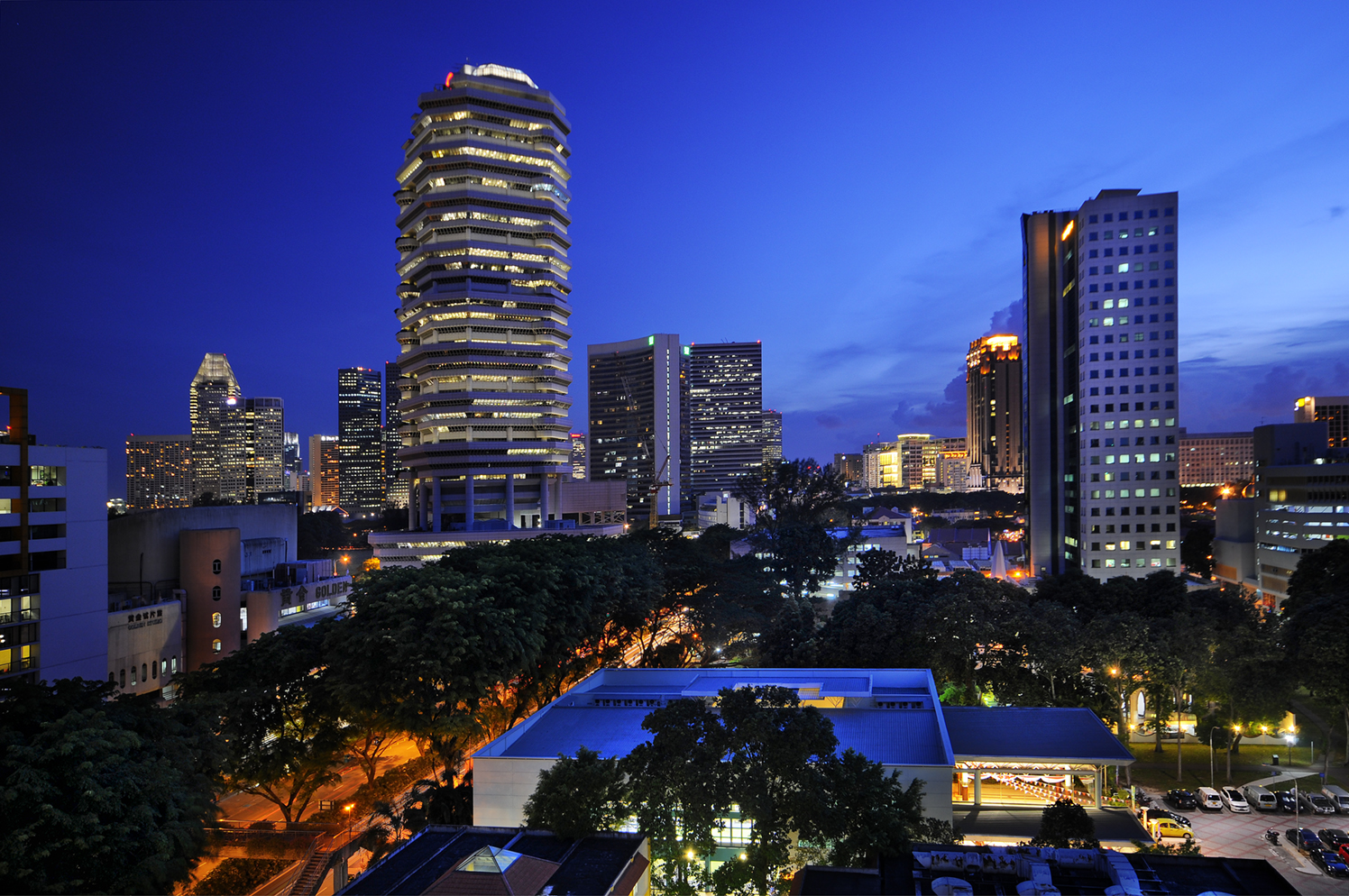
The Concourse, by Beach Road
