= The Plaza (Singapore) =

Skyscraper in Singapore

Coordinates: 1.2992°N 103.8582°E

The Plaza is a high-rise commercial and residential building on Beach Road in Kallang, Singapore. The complex consists of a 30-storey residential and commercial tower and an 8-storey building housing The Plaza Parkroyal hotel. One of the Poshest residential in the center of the central, Arab street, Bugis and marina skyline facing .

The tower has a distinctive triangular prism design, with each face being concave.

Embassy of Zimbabwe is located on the 13th floor of The Plaza whereas the Honorary Consulate of Belarus can be found on the 16th floor of the building.

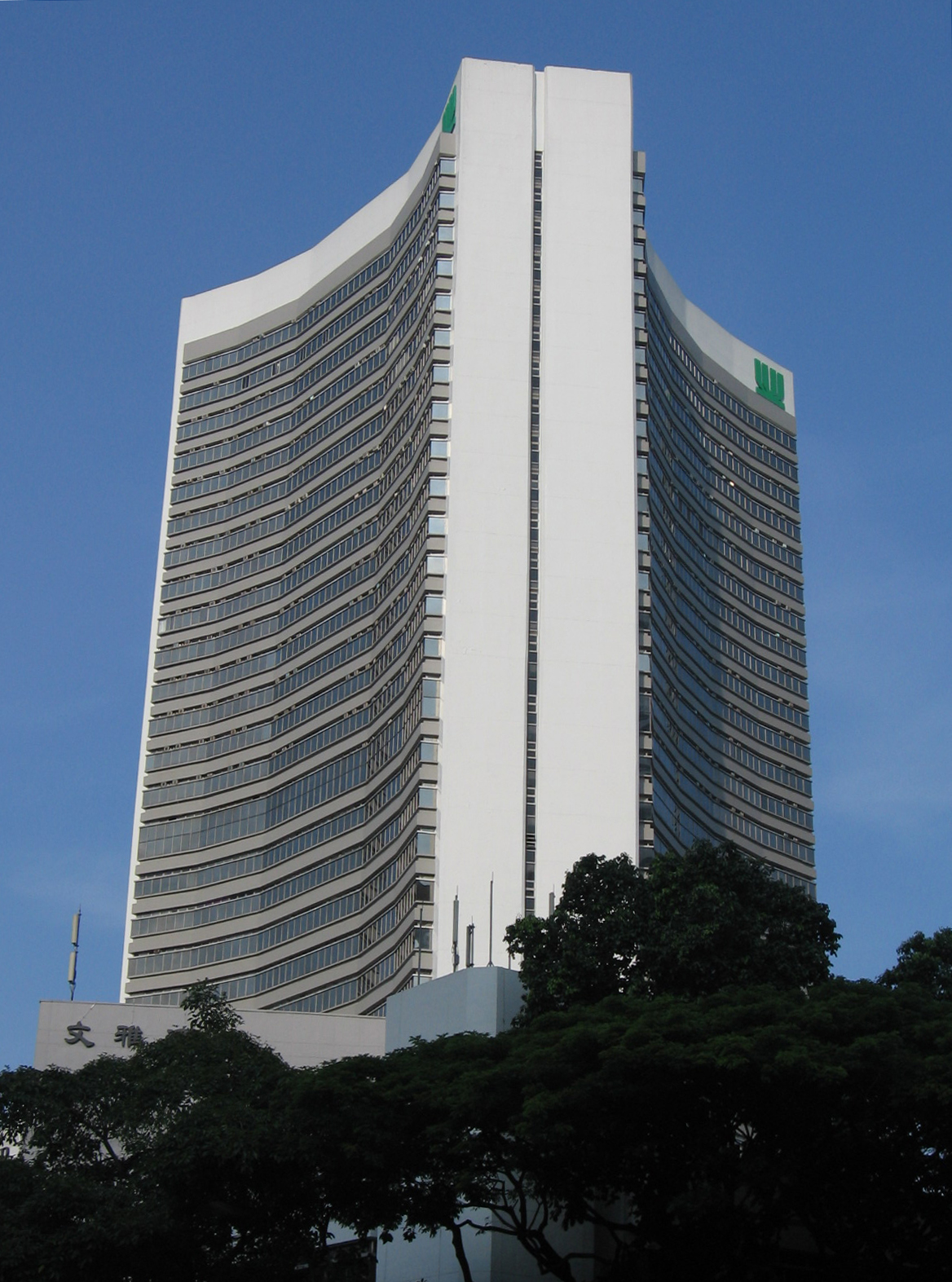
The Plaza – photographed in August 2007

== History ==
The Plaza complex was completed in 1979.
