= Nicoll Highway =

Major arterial road in Singapore

- Lebuhraya Nicoll (Malay) 尼诰大道 (Chinese) நிகோல் நெடுஞ்சாலை (Tamil)
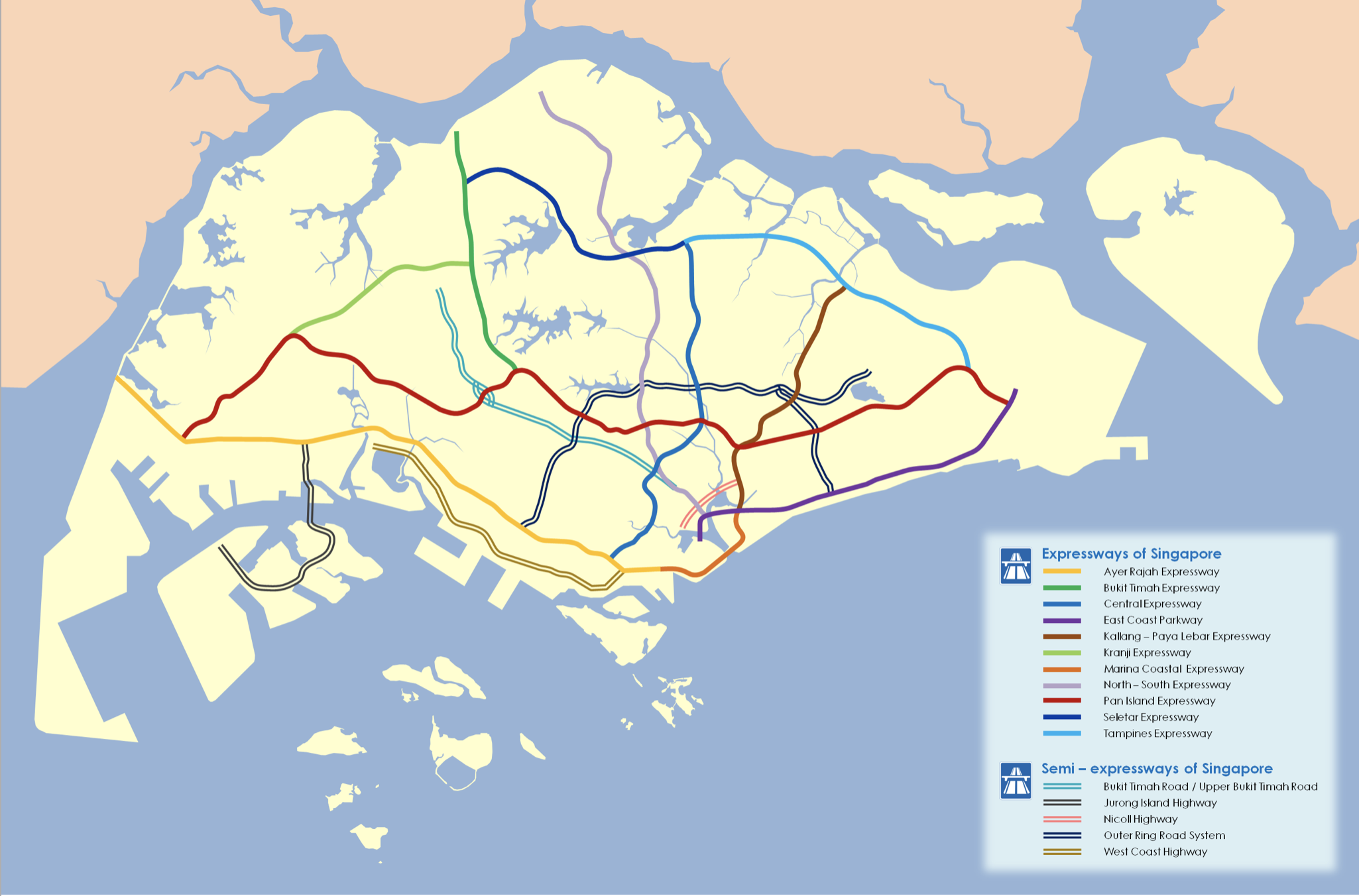
- Nicoll Highway is labelled in double pink line

Route information
- Existed: 1956–present

Major junctions
- West end: Esplanade
- East end: KPE; Kallang

Location
- Country: Singapore

Highway system
- Expressways of Singapore

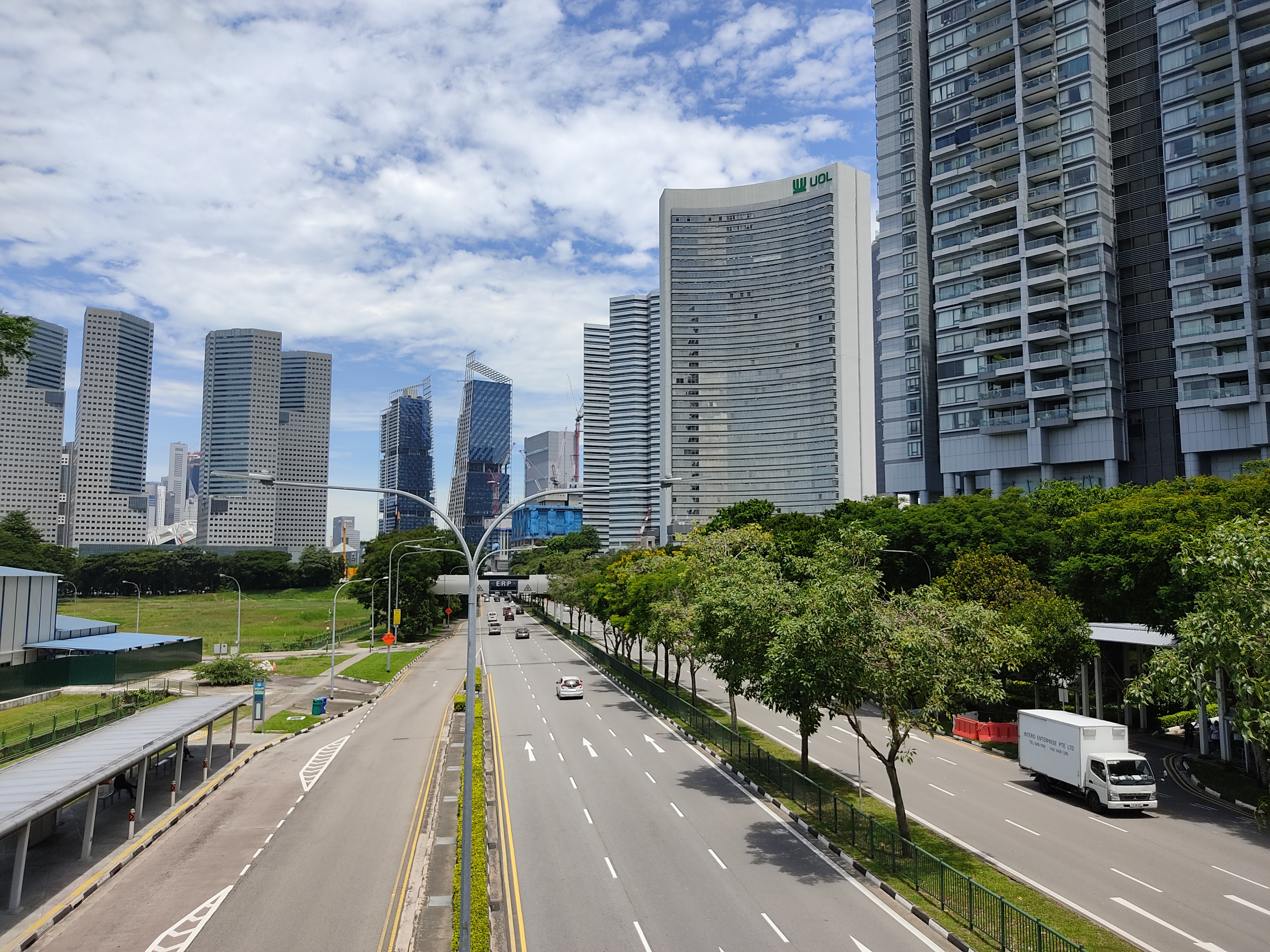
Nicoll Highway, towards the central business district

Nicoll Highway (/ˈnɪkoʊl/ NIK-ohl, Chinese: 尼诰大道, Malay: Lebuhraya Nicoll, Tamil: நிகோல் நெடுஞ்சாலை) is a major arterial road in Singapore which links the junctions of Guillemard Road, Sims Way and Mountbatten Road in Kallang to the junctions of Esplanade Drive, Raffles Avenue and Stamford Road in the city. En route, it passes through the areas of Kallang, Kampong Glam and Marina Centre.

Despite what its name may suggest, the speed limit on the highway is less than that of an expressway. The highway also has traffic light junctions at some of its intersections with roads such as Bras Basah Road and Esplanade Drive, which are not found in expressways.

== History ==
=== Etymology ===
The road was named after Sir John Fearns Nicoll, governor of the Colony of Singapore in the early 1950s, who played a major role in ensuring its construction.

=== Construction ===
The road was first planned by the Singapore Improvement Trust in the late 1940s to relieve the heavy rush-hour traffic along Kallang Road and provide an alternative route from the city area to Katong and Changi. These plans were finalised in July 1953, with work on the first section of the road, a bridge across the Kallang and Rochor rivers, commencing construction in early 1954. Costing a total of $12 million, Nicoll Highway was opened by then-Chief Minister Lim Yew Hock on 17 August 1956. With the road's opening, traffic conditions were greatly improved, and travel times to the city area cut by 25 to 35 minutes.

By the 1960s, the then four-lane Nicoll Highway was found to be insufficient to carry rush-hour traffic. Consequently, an additional carriageway was added in 1965. This carriageway was used for city-bound traffic during the morning peak hours and for traffic in the opposite direction during the afternoon peak. It was claimed by the Straits Times that traffic congestion was significantly reduced after the opening of the reversible carriageway.

=== Nicoll Highway collapse ===
At approximately 3:30 p.m. Singapore Time (UTC+8:00) on 20 April 2004, a section of Nicoll Highway between Ophir Road and Merdeka Bridge collapsed, due to the failure of the retaining wall of the Circle line tunnel below it. This section of the road had to be closed for several months for repairs. All bus services going through that sector of Nicoll Highway had to be redirected. The road was re-opened in December later that year.

== Landmarks ==
Some landmarks that can be seen along the road are:

- Civilian War Memorial
- Golden Mile Complex
- Golden Mile Tower
- Merdeka Bridge
- National Stadium
- One Raffles Link
- People's Association
- Shaw Towers
- Suntec City
- The Concourse
- The Gateway
- War Memorial Park

== Interchange along Nicoll Highway ==
Interchange with^{1}	Type	Remarks	Name of interchange
KPE, Sims Way, Guillemard Road and Mountbatten Road	Box	Start of Nicoll Highway leading westbound; end of Nicoll Highway leading eastbound	–
Stadium Road and links from Stadium Drive	3-way	–	–
Stadium Road	Flyover	–	Merdeka Bridge
Crawford Street and Republic Avenue	Flyover	–	Merdeka Bridge
Java Road	3-way	There is also a 3-way link from Republic Avenue	–
Ophir Road	Flyover	Ophir Road travels southbound only	Ophir Flyover
Rochor Road	Flyover	Rochor Road travels northbound only	Rochor Flyover
Middle Road	3-way	–	–
Raffles Boulevard and Bras Basah Road	Box	Raffles Boulevard and Bras Basah Road travels eastbound only	–
Raffles Avenue, Esplanade Drive and Stamford Road	Box	Raffles Avenue and Stamford Road travels westbound only; Start of Nicoll Highway going eastbound; end of Nicoll Highway going westbound	–

^Note 1: Road names are ordered in the clockwise fashion starting from the top.

== See also ==
- Expressways of Singapore
- Outer Ring Road System
- West Coast Highway, Singapore
