= Ophir Road =

Road in Singapore

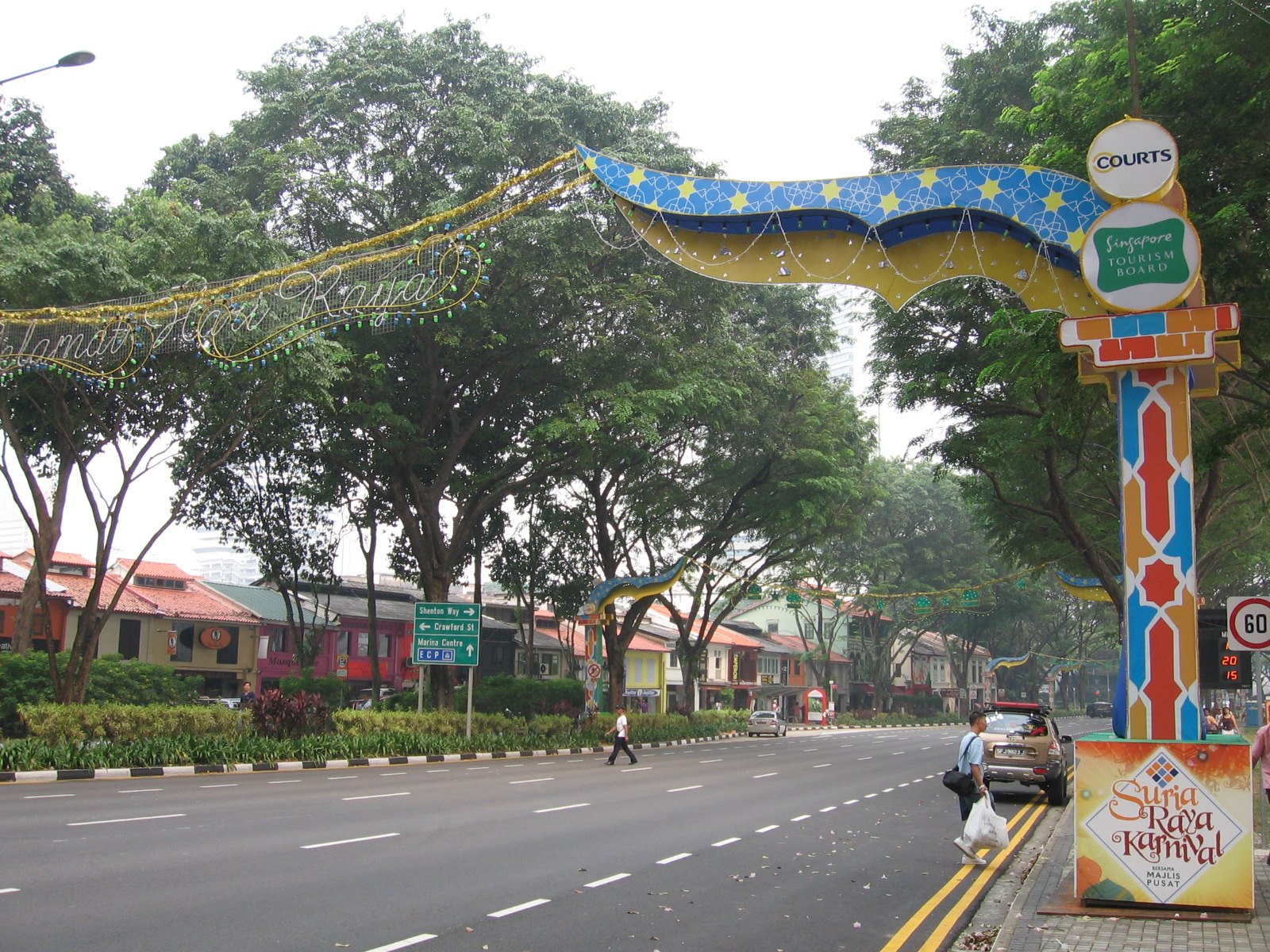
- Interactive map of Ophir Road
- Location: Singapore
- Coordinates: 1.3034°N 103.8542°E
- North/West end: junction of Sungei Road and Jalan Besar
- To: Ophir Flyover

Ophir Road (Malay: Jalan Ophir; Chinese: 奥菲亚路) is a road in Singapore. It starts after the junction of Sungei Road and Jalan Besar and ends after the Ophir Flyover leading towards East Coast Parkway (ECP).

Ophir Road is located within the planning areas of Kallang, Downtown Core and Rochor. This road also is affected with the North-South Expressway construction.
