= Merdeka Bridge, Singapore =

Bridge in Singapore

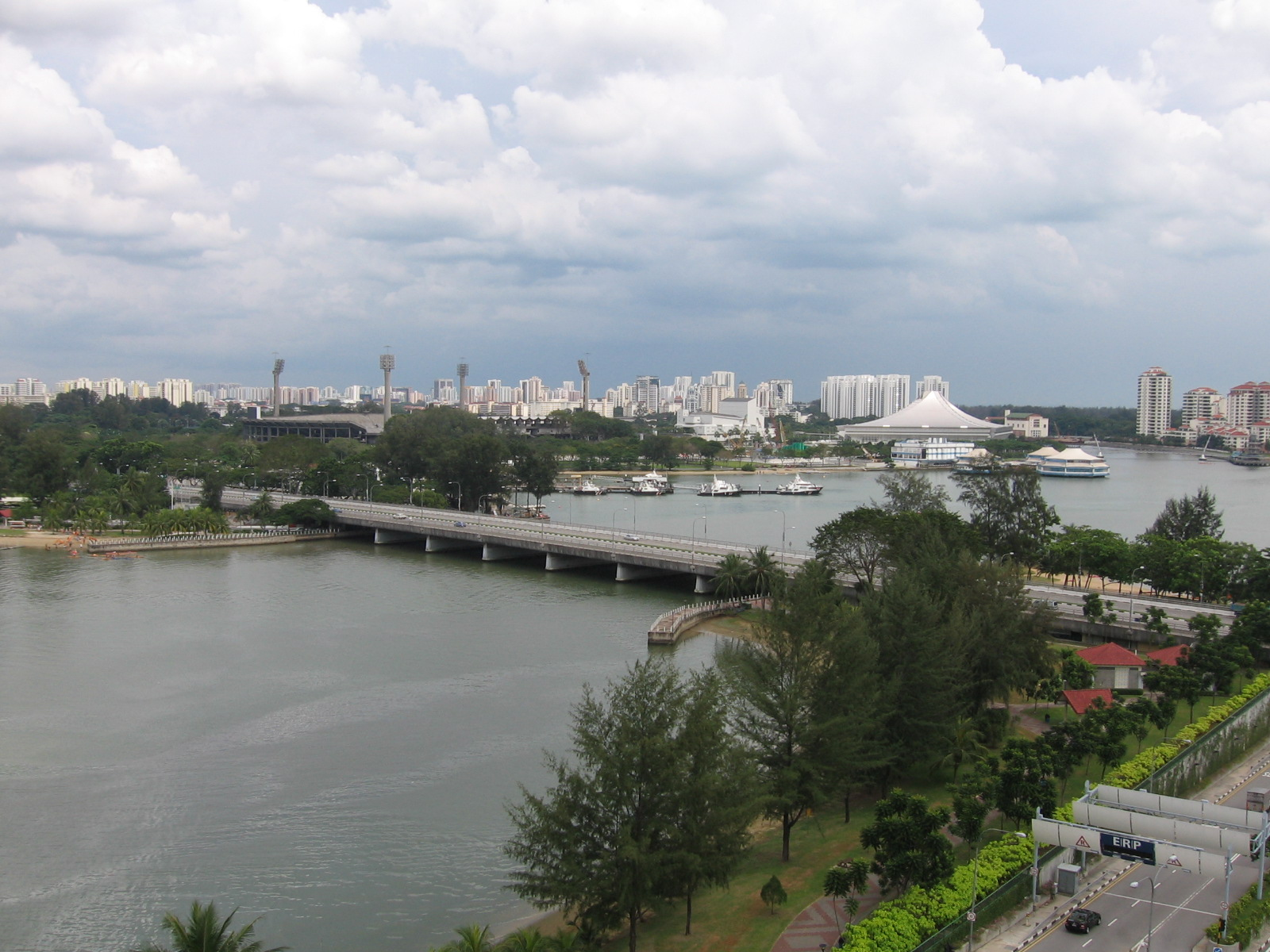
- Merdeka Bridge
- Coordinates: 1°18′15″N 103°52′06″E
- Carries: 6 lanes of Nicoll Highway, pedestrians and bicycles
- Crosses: Kallang Basin
- Locale: Kallang, Singapore
- Official name: Merdeka Bridge
- Other name(s): 独立桥 (Chinese); Jambatan Merdeka (Malay)
- Maintained by: CPG Corporation

Characteristics
- Design: Beam, Pre-stressed bridge
- Material: Concrete
- Total length: 2,000 ft (609.6 m), about 0.378 mi (0.6 km)
- Width: 65 ft (19.8 m)
- Longest span: 80 ft (24.4 m)

History
- Designer: R. J. Hollis-Bee
- Constructed by: Paul Y. Construction Company and Hume Industries
- Construction start: January 1955; 71 years ago
- Construction end: August 1956; 70 years ago
- Opened: 17 August 1956; 70 years ago

Location
- Interactive map of Merdeka Bridge, Singapore

The Merdeka Bridge (Chinese: 独立桥, Malay: Jambatan Merdeka) is a vehicular and pedestrian bridge located in Kallang in the south-eastern part of Singapore. It spans the river mouths of the Kallang River and Rochor River, which empty into the Kallang Basin. Designed by R. J. Hollis-Bee of the then Public Works Department (now CPG Corporation), the bridge was officially opened on 17 August 1956.

The Merdeka Bridge carries Nicoll Highway, a semi-expressway connecting Kallang with the Singapore downtown.

== Etymology ==
The bridge was named Merdeka Bridge by Minister for Communications and Works Francis Thomas as Merdeka means "independence" in Malay and to represent the confidence and aspiration of the people of Singapore. It also represents Singapore's freedom and independence after partial self-government was given by the British in 1955.

== History ==
Merdeka Bridge provides a main link between the east coast and the city via the Nicoll Highway.

== Merdeka Lions ==
The bridge's only attributes were the two stone lions guarding its two ends, known as the Merdeka Lions. Each lion had its back positioned, facing a tall blue mosaic monument adorned with the crest of the City of Singapore at the top. These sculptures were designed initially by the Public Works Department's L W Carpenter and contracted to Hong Kong based Italian sculptor and stone supplier Raoul Bigazzi. Mr Bigazzi had them made by a student of his in Manila in the Philippines. The identical pair were shipped here, towards the end of the bridge's construction. In 1966, the lions were removed to allow the widening of Nicoll Highway as well as the bridge. As a result, the two sculptures were then relocated to Stadium Walk. The statues were left abandoned at their location for the next three decades. After numerous suggestions from the public to move the twin sculptures to an appropriate site, the Public Works Department took the statues into storage. The PWD later transferred these statues to the Ministry of Defence in 1986. With the intention to install them in the then future SAFTI Military Institute located in Jurong West. In 1995, the two lions were moved by the ministry to the bottom of the SAFTI Tower at the institute, where they have remained since. A pair of exact replicas were made in 2019 and installed at Stadium Roar at Singapore's National Stadium.

== External Media ==
- Norman Edwards, Peter Keys (1996), Singapore - A Guide to Buildings, Streets, Places, Times Books International, ISBN 9971-65-231-5
- Infopedia article on the Merdeka Bridge
