= Masjid Tasek Utara =

Mosque in Singapore

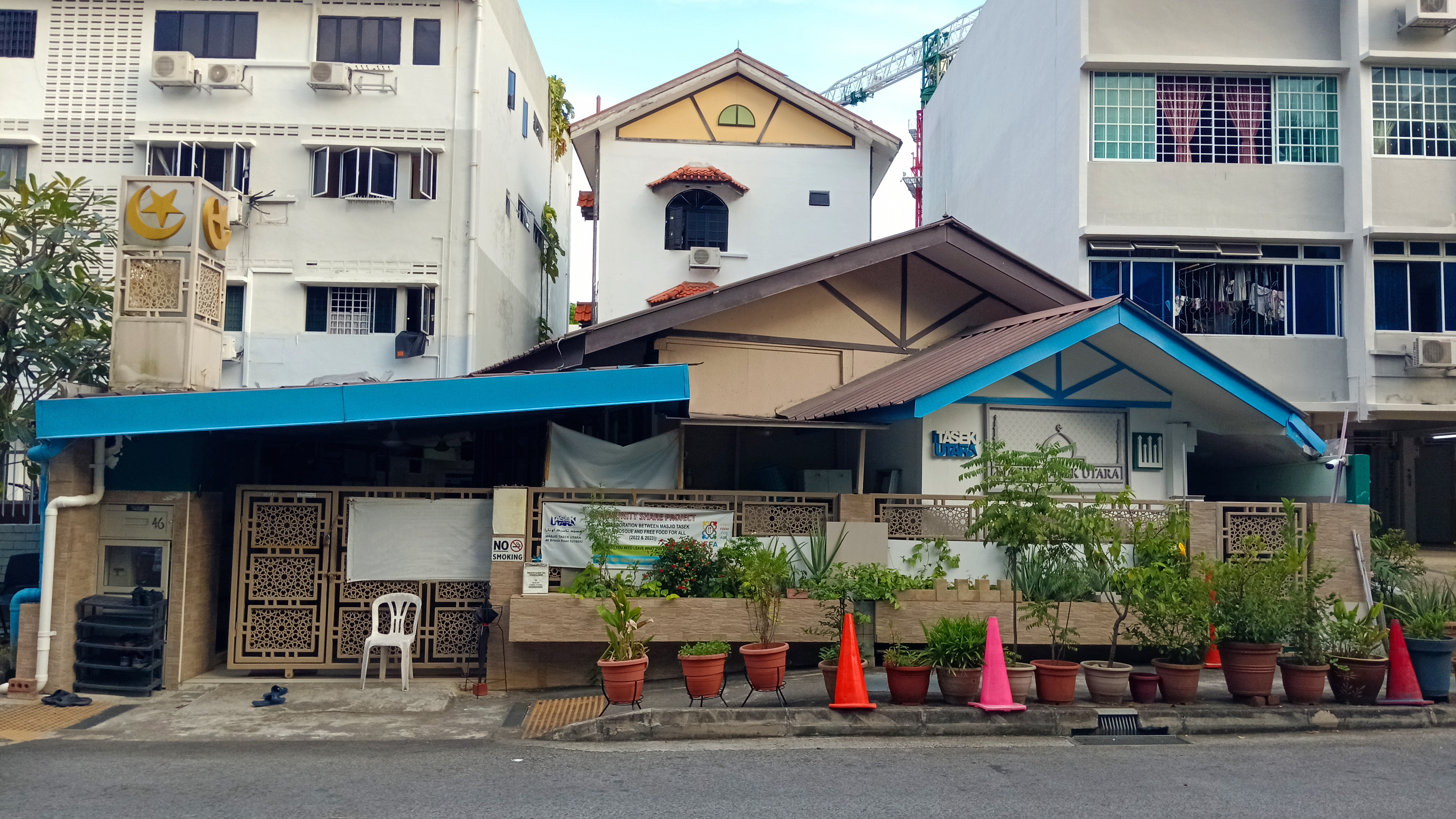

- Location in Singapore

Religion
- Affiliation: Sunni Islam

Location
- Location: 46 Bristol Road, Singapore 219852
- Country: Singapore
- Interactive map of Masjid Tasek Utara
- Coordinates: 1.3130242°N 103.8491239°E

Architecture
- Architect: Hiladt Architects (Reconstruction)
- Type: Mosque (formerly surau)
- Style: Islamic architecture, Modern
- Completed: 1907 (Original structure); 2017 (Reconstruction)
- Capacity: 120

Masjid Tasek Utara is a mosque located in the Pek Kio area within the Kampong Java district of Kallang, Singapore. Originally established in 1907, it is the smallest mosque in the country, with a capacity of only 120 congregants.

== History ==
The original structure at the site was a surau, built in 1907. The surau was mentioned in a 1964 list detailing the places where the Eid al-Adha prayer would be held, listed as "the surau at Tasek Utara and Bristol Road." After the independence of Singapore, the surau became known as a mosque, Masjid Tasek Utara; by 1967 it was listed as one of the mosques that were managed by the Majlis Ugama Islam Singapura (MUIS), the newly formed Islamic council of Singapore. In June 2002, the mosque ran advertisements in the Berita Harian newspaper for donations in order to fund an upgrading project to improve the situation of the mosque, which had been dilapidating, as well as repair the toilets and the electronics in the mosque such as the fans and air conditioner. These small reparation works were ultimately completed in 2008 under the purview of the MUIS.

In October 2016, the mosque was closed down for a reconstruction in order to accommodate more worshippers and replace the former mosque with a more modern and contemporary architectural style. The reconstruction was officially completed on 23 March 2017 and the rebuilt mosque was officially reopened on the next day, along with two other mosques, namely Masjid Hussain Sulaiman at Pasir Panjang, and Masjid Jamek Queenstown along Margaret Drive near Redhill.

== Transportation ==
Masjid Tasek Utara is situated at the junction of Bristol Road and Carlisle Road, within the landed housing estate of Cambridge in Pek Kio behind the KK Women's and Children's Hospital in Kampong Java. The nearest MRT station to the mosque is the Farrer Park MRT station.

== See also ==
- List of mosques in Singapore
