= NE10 =

NE10 may refer to:

- Doraville station, a Metropolitan Atlanta Rapid Transit Authority station, U.S., station code NE10
- Northeast-10 Conference, a college sports conference in the United States
- Potong Pasir MRT station, Singapore, station code NE10
- part of the NE postcode area in England
