= Green Mosque =

Green Mosque may refer to:

- al-Khadra Mosque, Nablus, Palestine
- Green Mosque, Balkh, Afghanistan
- Green Mosque, Pasir Panjang, Singapore
- Green Mosque, Kigali, Kigali, Rwanda
- Green Mosque, Bursa, Turkey
- Green Mosque, İznik, Turkey
