= Boon Keng MRT station =

Mass Rapid Transit station in Singapore

Boon Keng NE9 文庆 பூன் கெங்
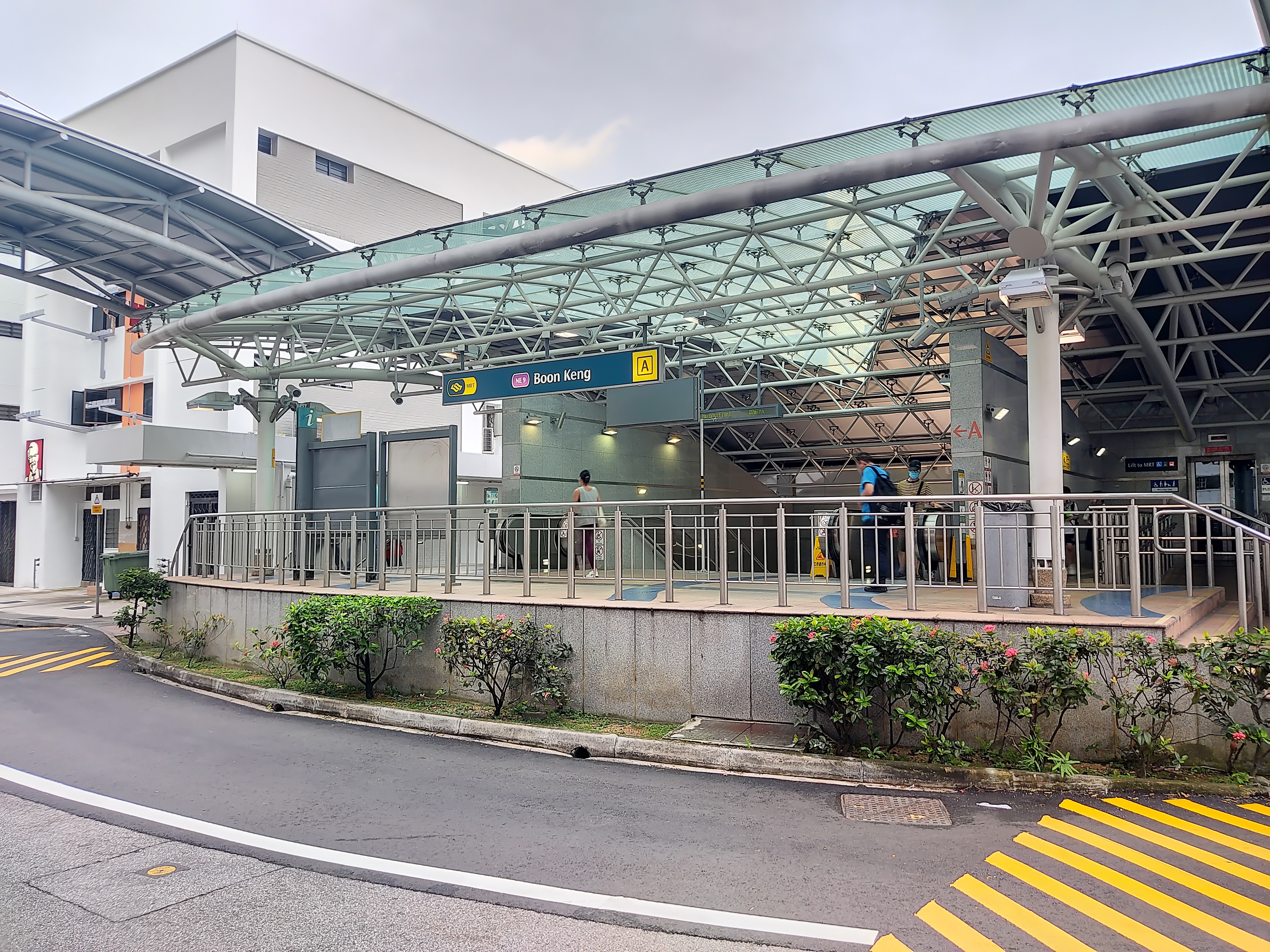
- Exit A of Boon Keng station

General information
- Location: 900 Serangoon Road, Singapore 328260
- Coordinates: 01°19′10″N 103°51′42″E
- System: Mass Rapid Transit (MRT) station
- Owner: Land Transport Authority
- Operator: SBS Transit
- Line: North East Line
- Platforms: 2 (1 island platform)
- Tracks: 2
- Connections: Bus, Taxi

Construction
- Structure type: Underground
- Platform levels: 1
- Parking: Yes (External)
- Accessible: Yes

Other information
- Station code: BNK

History
- Opened: 20 June 2003; 23 years ago

Passengers
- 2025: 23,250 per day

Services
| Preceding station | Mass Rapid Transit | Following station |
|---|---|---|
| Farrer Park towards HarbourFront | North East Line | Potong Pasir towards Punggol Coast |
Track layout
Location
- Location within Singapore Rail central area

Boon Keng MRT station is an underground Mass Rapid Transit (MRT) station on the North East Line (NEL) in Kallang, Singapore. Located underneath Serangoon Road just after the traffic junction with Towner Road and Boon Keng Road, the station primarily serves the Boon Keng area. Landmarks served by the station include Bendemeer Wet Market & Hawker Centre and Central Sikh Temple.

Boon Keng station was first announced in March 1996, as part of the 16 planned NEL stations. It was constructed using the semi top-down construction method. It opened on 20 June 2003. The station is a designated Civil Defence shelter and is wheelchair-accessible. As part of the Art-in-Transit programme, it features Metamorphosis, a public artwork by Lim Poh Teck that depicts the past and present of Boon Keng.

== History ==
The NEL, which was first proposed in 1984, received government approval in January 1996. Boon Keng station was among the sixteen NEL stations announced that March by communications minister Mah Bow Tan.

On 23 June 1997, the contract for the design and construction of Potong Pasir and Boon Keng stations and associated tunnels was awarded to a joint venture of Kumagai Gumi, Sembawang Engineering & Construction and Mitsui & Co. for $316.7 million. The contract included the construction of 1.8 kilometres (1.1 miles) of twin bored tunnels and 280 metres (920 ft) of cut-and-cover tunnels.

The station excavation required the demolition of 200 parking lots located at carparks serving Housing Development Board (HDB) flats Block 22 and Block 34. To mitigate the loss of amenities for residents, new replacement carparks were constructed in the vicinity of the affected blocks. The station's western diaphragm wall was constructed beneath Serangoon Road, necessitating several traffic diversions. Road metal decking was used to maintain overall road capacity during construction. Existing 230 kV electrical cables and cast-iron water pipes located along the site boundary had to be protected from damage and vibration, while pipes crossing the site were relocated by the Land Transport Authority.

The contractors utilised a semi top-down construction method for the station, whereby the roof slab was cast first, followed by excavation to the concourse level through large openings in the slab. (Note: Usually, the top-down method allow concurrent substructure and superstructure works. But in this case, the works did not require an aboveground superstructure and hence the term "semi top-down".) The concourse slab was then constructed, incorporating openings for further excavation to the platform level. The roof and concourse slabs were used to support the diaphragm walls, reducing ground movement and minimising disturbance to nearby HDB blocks. This approach was more cost-effective than the bottom-up method, which would have required extensive steel strutting to support the diaphragm walls.

Tunnelling between Boon Keng and Potong Pasir involved passing beneath shophouses along Serangoon Road, which were closely monitored for ground settlement. To minimise such risks, tunnelling was carried out continuously on a 24-hour basis rather than the original six-day work schedule. The tunnels also passed beneath Whampoa Canal and the Kallang River. At the request of the Public Utilities Board, a 50-metre section of the 25-metre-wide canal was reconstructed as a reinforced concrete canal above the tunnels. The station opened on 20 June 2003.

== Details ==
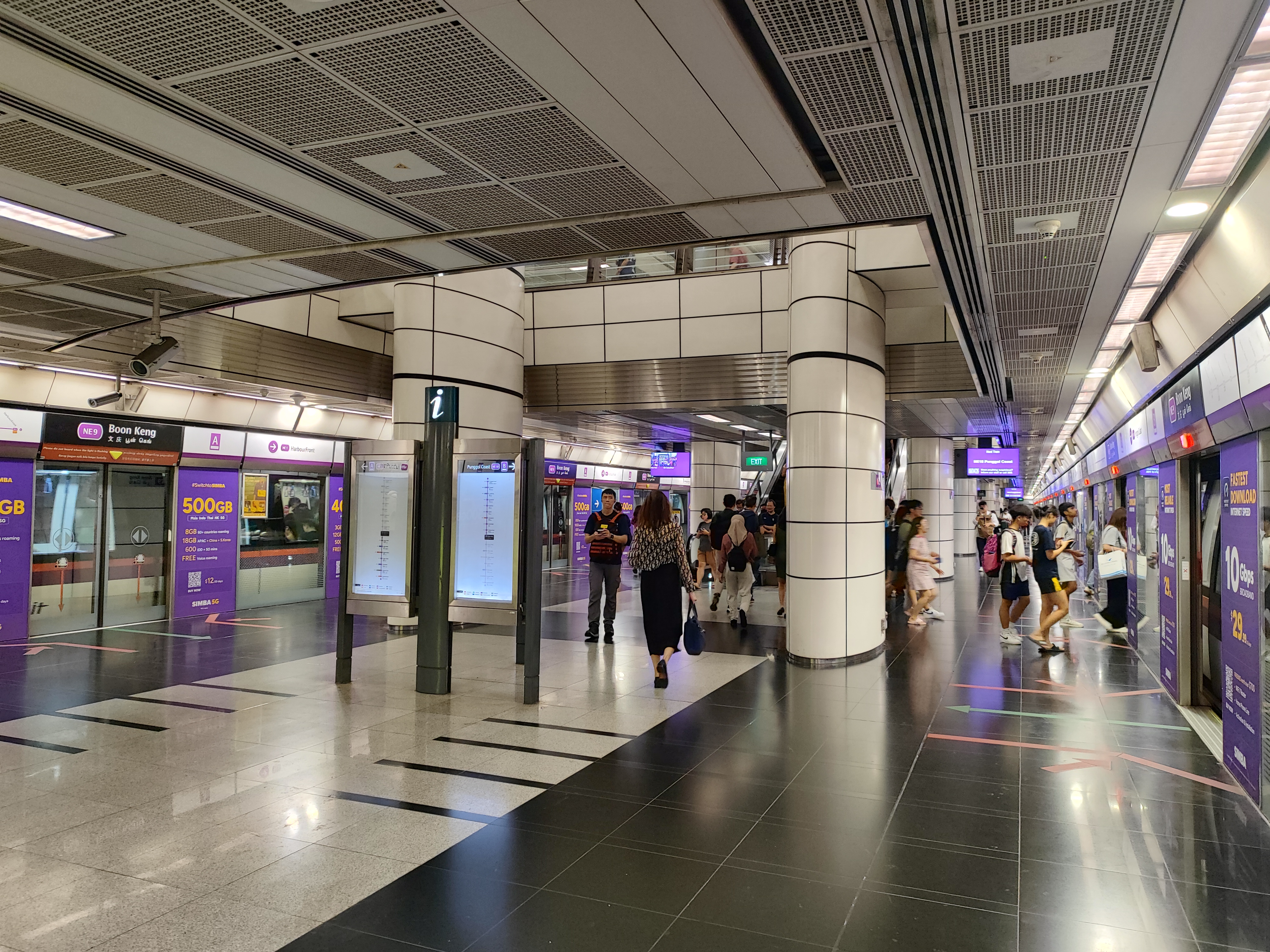
Platform level of Boon Keng

Boon Keng station serves the NEL and is between Farrer Park and Potong Pasir stations. The station code is NE9. Being part of the NEL, the station is operated by SBS Transit. The station is located underneath Serangoon Road near the junction with Towner Road. Surrounding landmarks include Bendemeer Wet Market & Hawker Centre, Kallang Community Club, Central Sikh Temple, Kallang Neighbourhood Police Post.

Like most NEL stations, Boon Keng is a designated Civil Defence shelter. It is designed to accommodate at least 7,500 people and can withstand airstrikes and chemical attacks. Equipment essential for the operations in the Civil Defence shelter is mounted on shock absorbers to prevent damage during a bombing. If the electrical supply to the shelter is disrupted, there are backup generators to keep operations going. The shelter has dedicated built-in decontamination chambers and dry toilets with collection bins that are designed to send human waste out of the shelter.

The station has accessibility features. A tactile system, consisting of tiles with rounded or elongated raised studs, guides visually impaired commuters through the station, with dedicated routes that connect the station entrances to the platforms or between the lines. Wider fare gates allow easier access for wheelchair users into the station.

=== Artwork ===
Boon Keng station features Metamorphosis by Lim Poh Teck as part of the MRT network's Art-in-Transit programme. Displayed in the station's concourse paid area, the work comprises two large acrylic paintings reproduced as vitreous enamel panels. The work, described by the LTA as "colourful" and "childlike", depicts the evolution of the Boon Keng area. According to Lim, the incorporation of humour in the work is intended to make it more accessible and enjoyable for commuters. One painting showcases the area's past – complete with boats, trams, and fishermen – while the second portrays contemporary life with high-rise flats and aircraft. These are complemented by icons and motifs derived from the main scenes – such as a cat, a double-decker bus, and a spaceship – displayed on enamel panels along the station walls.

The artist's research for the commission involved sketching sessions along the Kallang River and interviewing long-time residents who remembered Boon Keng's traditional trades and makeshift housing. Lim also researched on Lim Boon Keng, after whom the station was named. Lim originally drew 200 icons for the project, later narrowing the selection to 80, of which 30 were incorporated into the final artwork. The panels were fabricated at a vitreous enamel factory in Belgium, where Lim worked with the technicians to translate his acrylic paintings into the new medium. To replicate the vibrancy of the original works, an 11-colour silk-screening process was employed instead of the standard four-colour method. While he felt some nuances were lost, Lim said that the process opened up new creative possibilities beyond the conventional limits of canvas or three-dimensional work.
