= CDL EcoTrain =

- The CDL EcoTrain in 2026.

General information
- Status: Active
- Type: Passenger railroad car
- Location: Common area of City Square Mall, Singapore
- Coordinates: 1.3117°N 103.8553°E
- Completed: 2025
- Owner: City Developments Limited

The CDL EcoTrain is an interactive exhibit located in the common area of City Square Mall within Kallang, Singapore. Launched in 2025 by real estate company City Developments Limited, the CDL EcoTrain is repurposed from a decommissioned passenger carriage and features eco-friendly features such as solar power and rubber flooring. It can also be accessed from the Farrer Park MRT station.

== History ==
In 2024, the addition of an interactive exhibit to the common area of the City Square Mall at Kallang was announced by local real estate company, City Developments Limited (CDL). The proposed exhibit would be composed of a decommissioned Mass Rapid Transit (MRT) passenger carriage that had been converted into a miniature museum to raise awareness on environmental issues, such as climate change and global warming. It is also situated directly outside Exit H to the Farrer Park MRT station.

Interior of the CDL EcoTrain.

== Features ==
The interior of the train carriage has been gutted and instead furnished with television monitors, as well as thematic wallpapers to adorn the walls of the carriage. As part of the eco-friendly initiative, the CDL EcoTrain is also powered by solar energy and has rubber flooring. The carriage also has spaces for workshops and classes to be conducted. Outside the carriage is a small artificial forest that is known as the CDL MicroForest which measures 520 sqm² and is developed in collaboration with researchers from the National University of Singapore and is a habitat to various species of birds, as well as tiny creatures such as millipedes and springtails.

== See also ==
- City Square Mall
