= Leaning buildings in Santos =

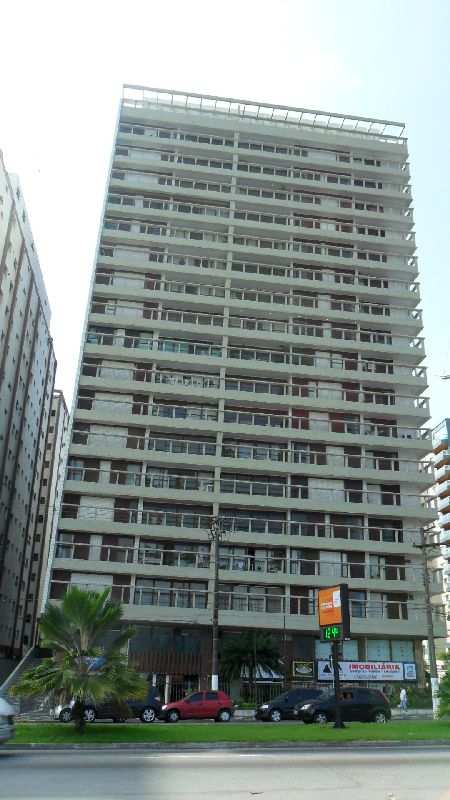
One of the many affected buildings in Santos; located at Av. Bartholomeu de Gusmão, 22.

The leaning buildings in Santos are a set of various buildings located on the city of Santos, Brazil, that since the 1970s, started to incline to varied directions and angles, enough to be seen from a naked eye. These buildings became a curiosity for the people that inhabit and visit the city. In 2024, the city's prefecture counted that 65 of the 651 buildings in its shoreline to be affected with the condition, with 319 being the total number of tilted buildings across the city.

The case of the leaning buildings in Santos remains an emblematic example of the challenges involved in construction on unstable soil and of the evolution of technical knowledge in civil engineering.

== Causes ==
All the buildings affected were constructed in a period that the technical knowledge about the construction of high rise buildings was limited. During that time, the city was experience a high economic and imobiliary growth, leading to the buildings being constructed in an accelerated manner and with shallow foundations, with around of 3 to 4 meters of depth. These foundations reached only the superficial soil layer, composed of relatively firm, fine clayey sand. However, beneath this layer lies a softer stratum of fine silty sand which, upon being subjected to the cumulative weight of the structures, began to deform, causing differential settlement of the structures.

Various interventions were carried out over the years to mitigate the problem, such as foundation reinforcements and attempts to remove the soft soil. Despite some positive results, many buildings continued to tilt gradually. Nevertheless, most of these buildings remained inhabited, becoming a peculiar urban landmark of the city.

== Maintenance ==
The maintenance in the buildings requires attention and is expensive, due to the constant fixing of columns, the high cost of the elevators and the need of authorization of an engineer for any maintenance that isn't painting, as the building needs to issue reports that they are not at risk.

Currently, the leaning buildings in Santos are not at structural risk. According to City Hall, technical reports are issued every two years.

== Life inside the buildings ==
Inhabitants of the buildings report that life in them is normal but with small adaptations, due to doors that close down by themselves as well as round objects rolling through the floor. In the beginning, inhabitants tend to have minor effects such as dizziness when leaving the elevator, but the body gets accostumed after a certain period.

These buildings housed approximately 16,590 people, equivalent to about 3% of the city's population at the time, distributed across 2,832 apartments.
