= Settling (disambiguation) =

Settling is the process by which particulates move towards the bottom of a liquid and form a sediment.

It may also refer to:

- Human settling, migration to a region where permanent residence is established.
- The Settling, an audio drama
- Settling (structural), sinking of a building foundation
