= City Square Mall =

Shopping mall in Singapore

- 城市广场
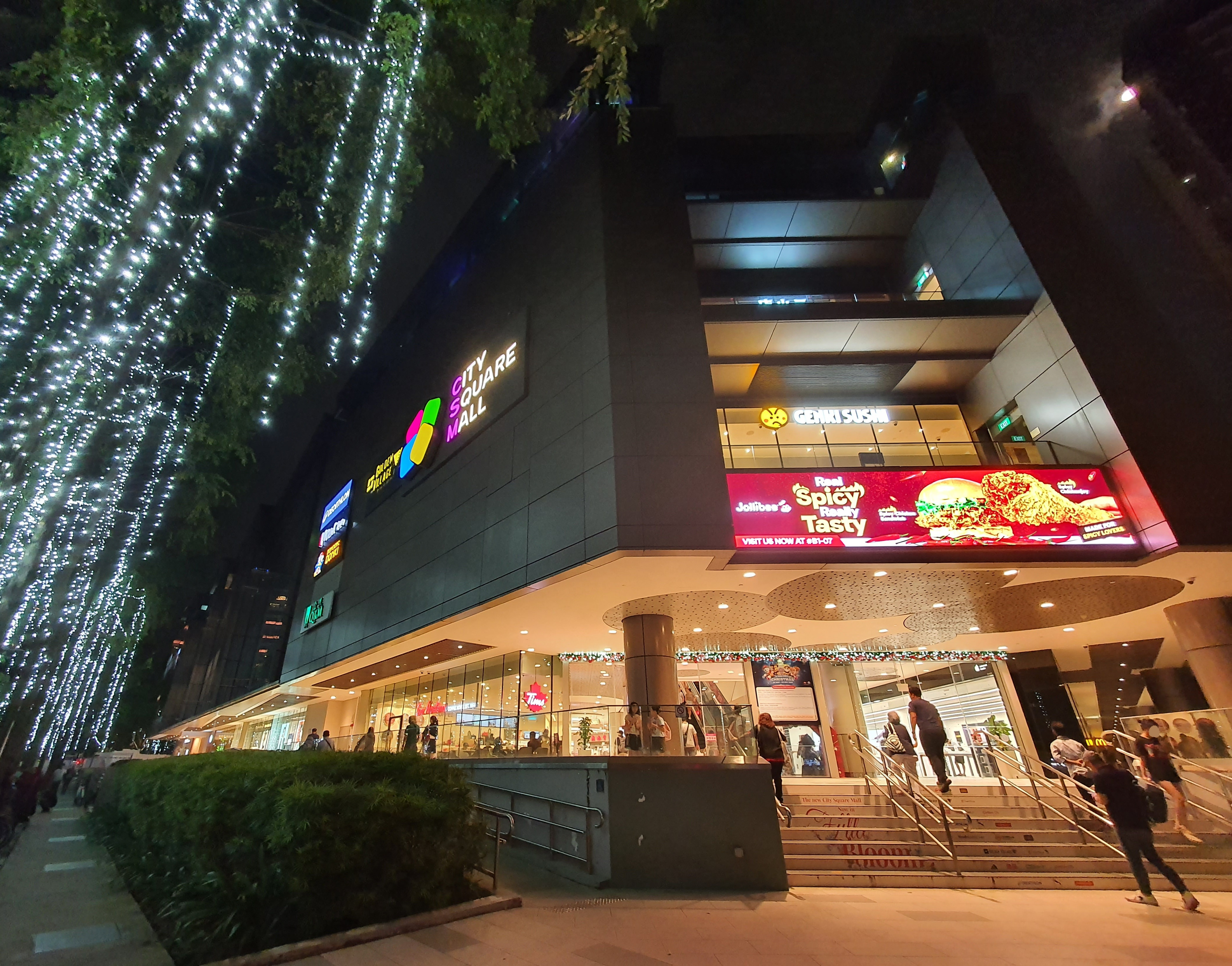
- City Square Mall at night (2025)
- Location: Kallang, Singapore
- Coordinates: 1.3117°N 103.8564°E
- Address: 180 Kitchener Road, Singapore 208539
- Opened: 19 September 2009; 17 years ago (operational); 20 March 2010; 16 years ago (official)
- Developer: City Developments Limited
- Manager: City Developments Limited
- Owner: City Developments Limited
- Architect: Ong & Ong Architects Pte Ltd
- Num. of stores: over 200
- Num. of anchor tenants: 8
- Floor area: 700,000 square feet (65,000 m^{2})
- Floors: 11 (9 levels, 2 basements)
- Public transit: NE8 Farrer Park
- Website: citysquaremall.com.sg

City Square Mall (Chinese: 城市广场; pinyin: Chéng Shì Guǎng Chǎng) is Singapore's first eco-mall to be integrated with a 49,000 sq ft (4,600 m^{2}) urban park named City Green, located within the planning area of Kallang. The mall sits on the site of Singapore's historic New World Amusement Park and is directly connected to Farrer Park MRT station. City Green is designed to provide a learning experience about ecology and the natural environment.

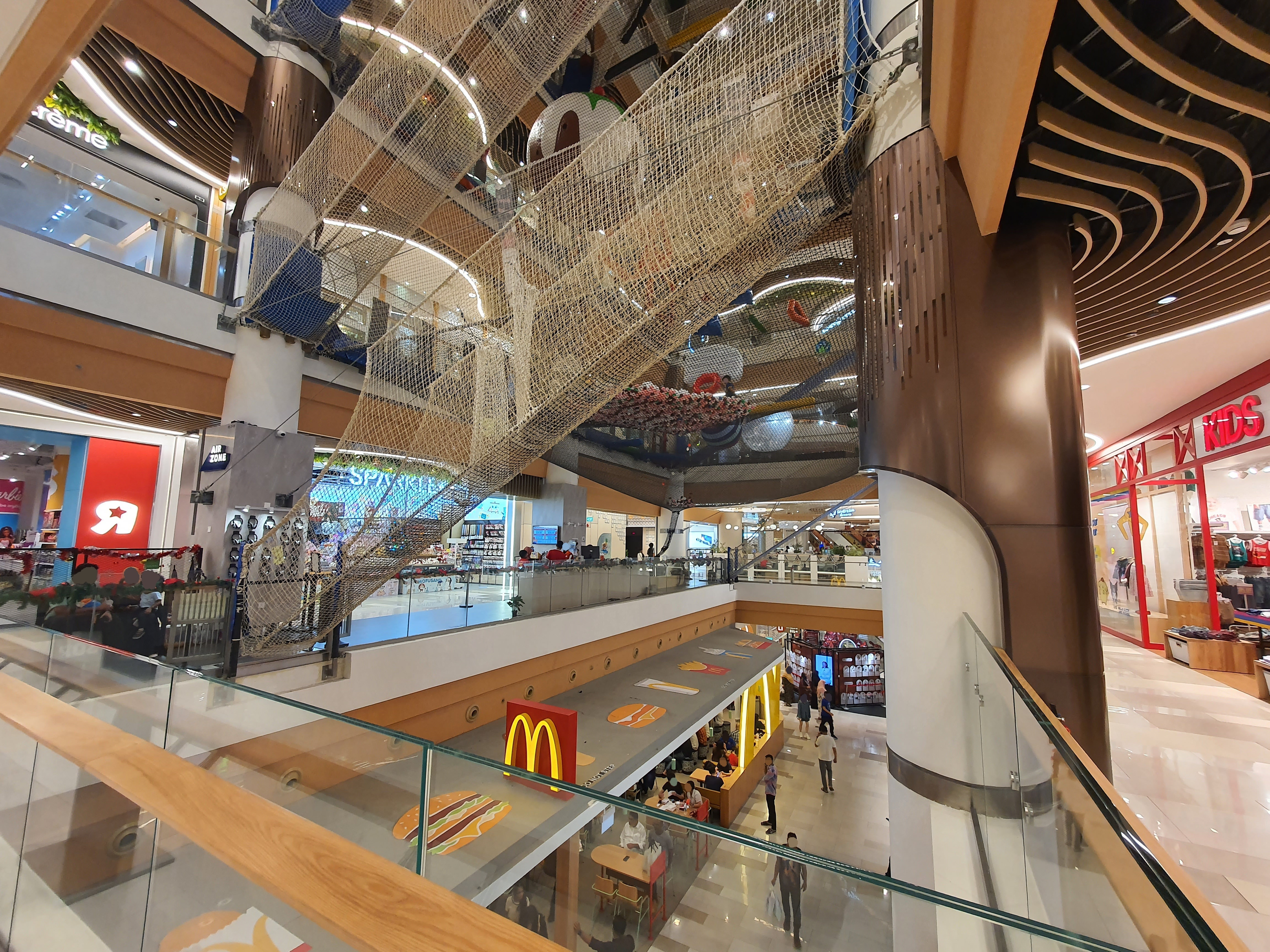
Interior

City Square Mall is the first mall in Singapore awarded the Green Mark Platinum Award by the Building and Construction Authority (BCA).

It has a total of 9 floors, with 2 basements. It also has an eco-friendly common area which features a playground as well as an interactive exhibit known as the CDL EcoTrain that is developed from a decommissioned train carriage.
