= Farrer Park Hospital =

- The Farrer Park Company
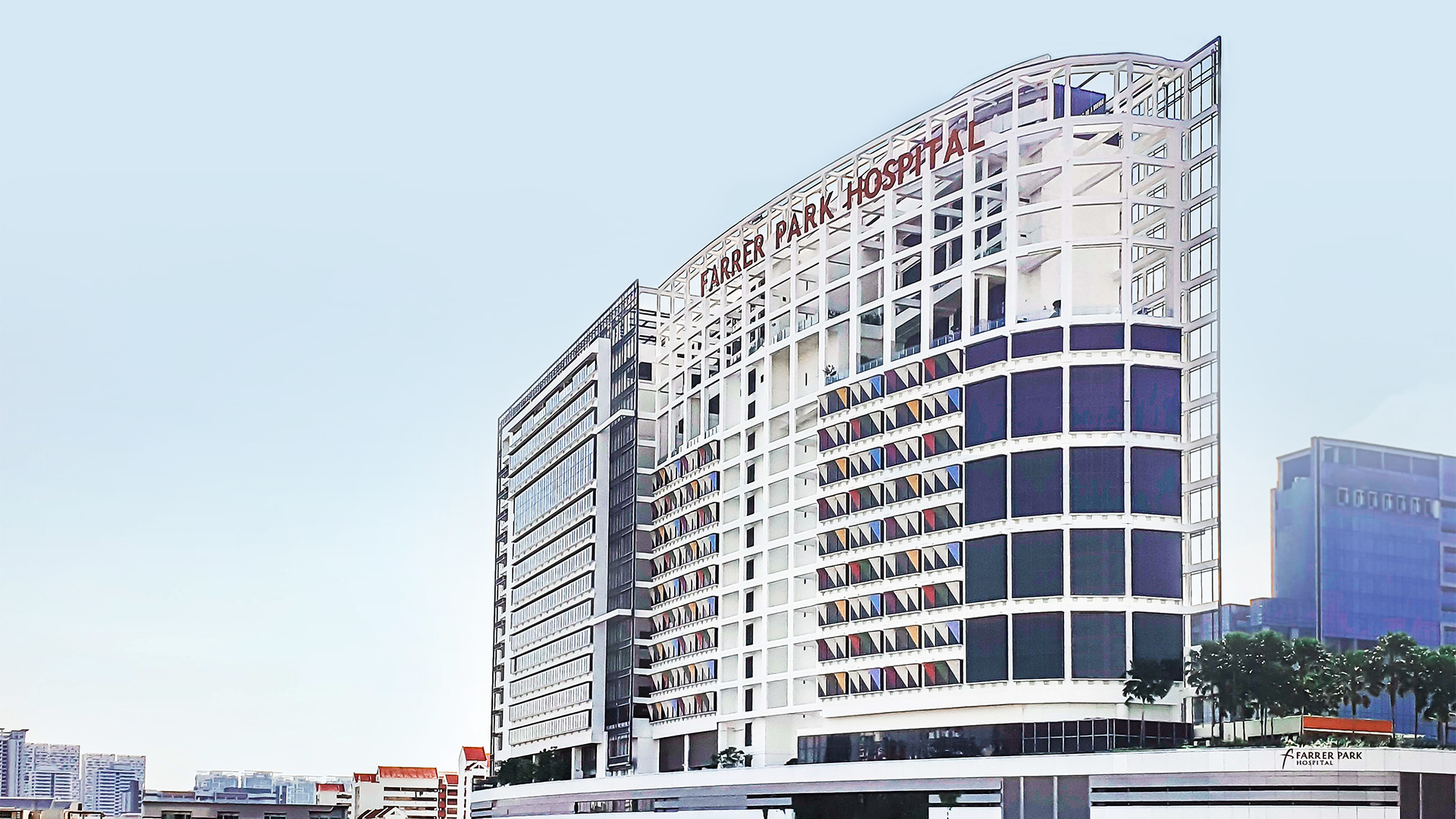

Geography
- Location: 1 Farrer Park Station Road, #02-01, Connexion, Singapore 217562
- Coordinates: 1.3127619°N 103.8545562°E

Organisation
- Type: General

Services
- Emergency department: Yes
- Beds: 125

History
- Founded: 16 March 2016; 10 years ago

Links
- Website: https://www.farrerpark.com/

Farrer Park Hospital is a private tertiary healthcare institution in Farrer Park, Singapore. Located above the Farrer Park MRT station at the Connexion building, the hospital has a capacity of 125 beds across four inpatient suites and 18 operating theaters including major surgery, cardiovascular and endoscopic suites. It is interconnected with the Farrer Park Medical Centre, where there are 10 floors of suites for over 280 medical specialists, as well as One Farrer Hotel. The complex was designed

Farrer Park Hospital is Singapore's first integrated healthcare and hospitality complex, with a Hospital, Medical Centre, Hotel and retail facilities housed in a 20-storey building complex called Connexion to deliver healthcare, hospitality, preventive medicine, and medical education under one roof. Connexion is also designed with sustainability principles such as eco-friendly energy and water management systems and recycling measures that allows the hospital to harvest rainwater to irrigate their landscape gardens.

Farrer Park Hospital operates dedicated Centres of Excellence in cancer care, heart health, bone and joint care, and surgical care, each supported by multidisciplinary specialists and allied health teams providing structured care pathways. The adjacent Farrer Park Medical Centre houses specialist clinics across more than 25 specialties, catering to patients in Singapore and the region.

Notable treatments include the use of Artificial Intelligence(AI) in colorectal screenings which aims to improve detection, classification, screening, and surveillance for colorectal polyps and cancer. The hospital has since included AI-powered CT technology for stroke and cardiac conditions at its Diagnostic Imaging Suite.

== History ==
Farrer Park Hospital was opened on March 16, 2016 by Health Minister Gan Kim Yong. Plans for the hospital were first announced in 2008. Construction took place from 2009 through 2014, with the first clinic opening at Farrer Park Medical Centre in May 2014. Other facilities in the hospital opened in phases.

The hospital was founded, developed and managed by physicians where their collective clinical and patient-fronting experiences led to the creation of a patient-centric and clinically functional private healthcare facility.
