= Mustafa Centre =

- முஸ்தபா சென்டர் Mustapā Cenṭar (Transliteration)
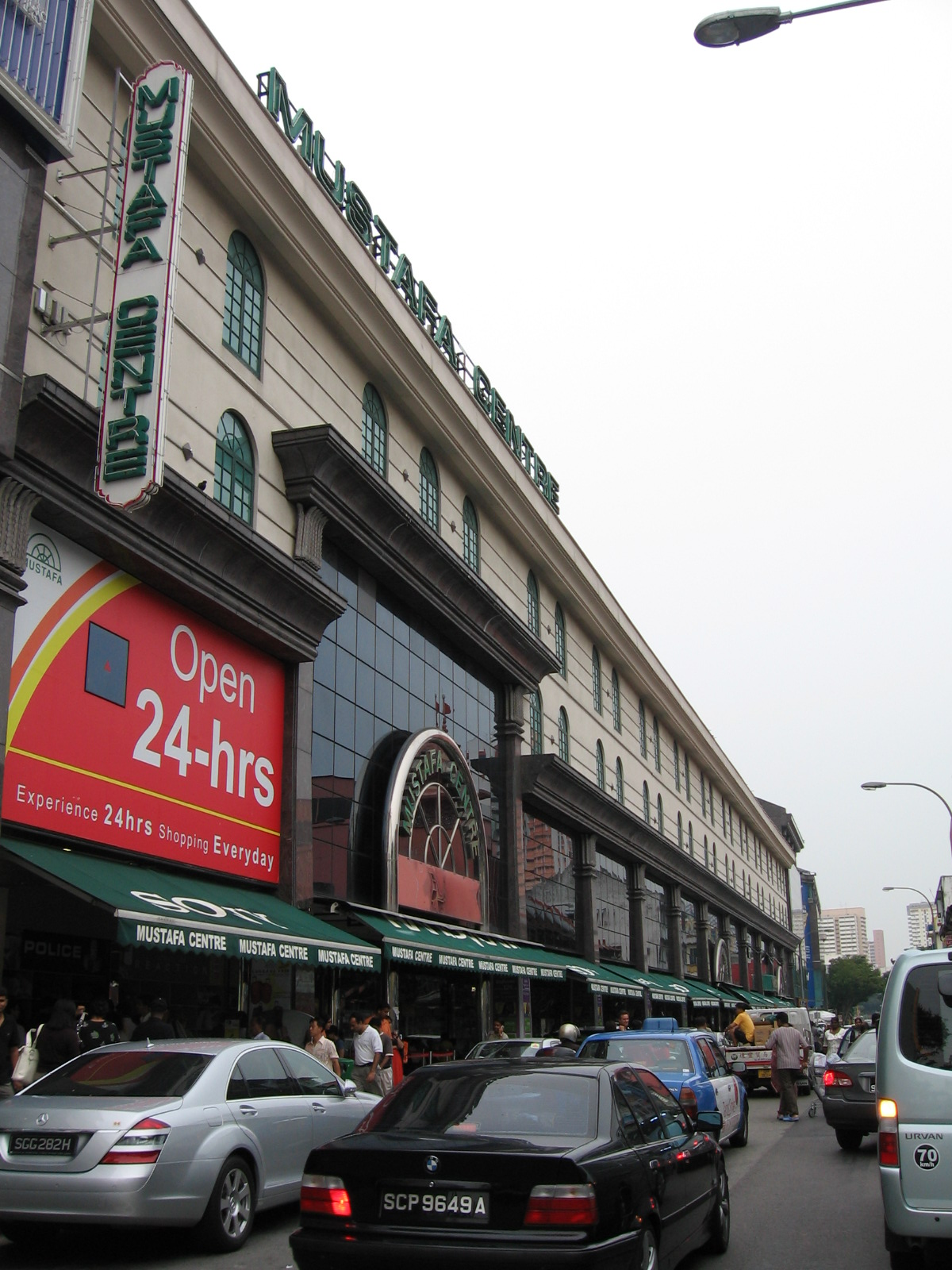
- Main store along Syed Alwi Road
- Location: Syed Alwi Road, Little India, Singapore
- Coordinates: 1°18′35″N 103°51′21″E
- Address: 145 Syed Alwi Road, Singapore 207704
- Opened: April 1995; 31 years ago
- Developer: Haji Mohamed Mustafa, Mustaq Ahmad Mustafa
- Num. of stores: 1 main store in Singapore, and branches in Chennai, Dhaka and Bintan
- Num. of anchor tenants: None
- Floor area: 400,000 sq ft (37,000 m^{2})
- Floors: 8
- Parking: Levels 3-4 (shared with shops) Levels 5-7 (full parking)
- Public transit: NE8 Farrer Park; DT22 Jalan Besar
- Website: www.mustafa.com.sg

Mustafa Centre is a shopping mall in Singapore, situated on Syed Alwi Road in the cultural district of Little India, within the planning area of Kallang. Within a walking distance from Farrer Park station and Jalan Besar station on the North East Line and Downtown Line, Mustafa Centre is a retail hub attracting many shoppers with its wide variety of products and services.

== History ==
Haji Mohamed Mustafa (Note: Urdu: حج محمدمصطفی) was born in India to a farming family and grew up in Bhadethi Jaunpur, Uttar Pradesh. He arrived in Muar, Malaysia in 1950, and began peddling dumplings, from village to village. His son, Mustaq Ahmad, (Note: Urdu: مشتاق احمد) was born in Uttar Pradesh in 1951 and joined his father in Singapore when he was five. As he grew, Ahmad started helping out at his father's food stall, selling tea and bread. Soon he began to sell handkerchiefs at fixed prices, next to his father's food stall, using pocket money given to him by his father to buy the goods he needed.

Inspired by his son's business acumen, and realised the potential in the clothing retail business, Haji Mohammed gave up selling tea and bread at his stall, and started selling children's clothes and garments for adults in the 1960s.

In 1971, Ahmad expanded the family business, setting up a small 500 sq ft shop in Campbell Lane that sold ready-made garments, and named it Mohamed Mustafa, after his father.

On 11 July 1973, Haji Mohamed Mustafa and his cousin, Samsuddin (Note: Urdu: شمس الدين) (25 July 1925 - April 2011), commenced a wholesale business through a partnership known as Mohamed Mustafa & Samsuddin Co (“MMSC”). From 23 July 1973, MMSC's branch would operate from 19 Campbell Lane. It mainly sold ready-made clothing and later expanded to sale of electronic items. In 1985, they moved their business to the ground floor of Serangoon Plaza.

In 1990, Mustafa; his eldest son, Mustaq Ahmad; and Samsuddin, founded Mohamed Mustafa and Samsudin Co Pte Ltd. As their business expanded, they bought a shophouse on Syed Alwi Road. Subsequently, they bought the neighboring units and decided to build a new shopping mall to house their business. Eventually, in 1995, the store expanded to become Mustafa Centre – a 75,000- square feet department store with a 130-room hotel. MMSCPL went public in 2011, with its first bonds sold in February 2014.

In 2008, Mustaq Ahmad made it to the Forbes list of the 40 richest Singaporeans (at number 38).

On 2 April 2020, Mustafa Centre was identified as one of the many COVID-19 clusters, with over 100 cases among the foreign workers' dormitories being attributed to it. It closed and underwent a disinfection thereafter, and was reopened partially on 6 May 2020, after Singapore authorities eased its preventive measures to contain the spread of the virus. Since the reopening, operating hours were adjusted to 9.30am - 11.30pm daily due to high electricity costs and rental costs, previously it was operated 24 hours. In July 2022, it extended its hours until 2am. On 6 September 2024, Mustafa Centre resumed 24-hour operation.

On 27 August 2020, Mustaq announced cost-cutting measures which affected the salaries of some workers, and non-renewal of work permits of its foreign workers. The company had also worked with various unions and government entities to help redeploy its excess workers resulting from the pandemic to other companies, avoiding the necessity of a retrenchment exercise.

On 28 October 2025, Mustafa rolled out its online ecommerce website after years of customers' requests. During COVID-19, it lost customers as they were unable to patronise the shopping mall physically.

== Facilities ==
Mustafa Centre houses the Mustafa department store, which caters mainly to the budget market. The department store consists of two shopping centres: one retailing jewelry and household appliances and functioning as a supermarket, and the other selling a variety of other products such as books, DVDs, watches, electronic goods, footwear, toys, and clothing.

Mustafa Centre sells more than 300,000 items and provides many services such as foreign exchange and travel arrangements. In late 2011, Mustafa Centre opened a new rooftop restaurant named Kebabs ‘n Curries in its new wing. The restaurant serves a range of Asian dishes from 5 pm till 2 am daily.

== Overseas Operations ==
=== India ===
The business expanded internationally, to Chennai, India, in 2000 with an 8,000 sq ft jewellery shop called Mustafa Goldmart, housed in a 16,000 sq ft building.

=== Bangladesh ===
Mustafa Centre has also expanded its reach into Dhaka, Bangladesh in 2012, opening a chain store called Mustafa Mart at the Bashundhara City mall.

=== Malaysia ===
Mustafa Centre plans to open its first department store in Malaysia in a shopping mall in Johor Bahru. Singapore-listed Capital World said that it will sell most of the retail space at its 11-storey Capital City Mall in Tampoi to Mustafa's for MYR 368 million. Mustafa Centre’s first Malaysian outlet is planned for Capital City Mall in Tampoi, Johor Bahru. The mall opened in October 2018 but has been shut since February 2020 after its developer, Capital World, ran into financial difficulties and underwent debt restructuring.. In 2023, Mustafa agreed to purchase 591 unsold retail units in the mall for its planned flagship store in Malaysia."Singapore retailer Mustafa buys part of JB mall, aims to open first flagship store in Malaysia". Channel NewsAsia. 27 January 2023. Fit-out and renovation works for the Johor Bahru outlet later began, with the opening targeted before the first quarter of 2027."Capital World advances Johor mall plans as Mustafa Centre fit-out begins". Singapore Business Review. 14 April 2026.. Mustafa's will buy 591 unsold retail units, representing a combined net lettable area of 641,216 sq ft. It will also acquire 374 accessory parcels at the mall, including al fresco and multi-purpose areas spanning a total of 1.28 million sq ft, and all 2,181 carpark spaces. Initially expected to open in the second half of 2023, it has been forced to push back plans due to delays in negotiating for more retail space and slow progress in construction work.

=== Indonesia ===
In 2003, the company paid SGD 15 million for a building in Jakarta, Indonesia, that stands on a 33,000 sq m plot of land. Rental dues paid by tenants in that building acts as another source of revenue for the company.

It will be located in the former Golden Truly building in Gunung Sahari, Central Jakarta. Golden Truly Mall officially closed operations on 1 December 2020.

In early 2023, Rumors about the presence of Mustafa Center in Indonesia have been confirmed by the Indonesian Ambassador to Singapore, Suryo Pratomo via his Instagram account. It will be located in the former-Golden Truly building in Kemayoran, Jakarta, and plans to open in 2024.

The company opened its first Indonesian store at Bintan Regency, Riau Islands in 2025.

== See also ==
- List of shopping malls in Singapore
