= Masjid Jamek Queenstown =

Mosque located in Queenstown, Singapore

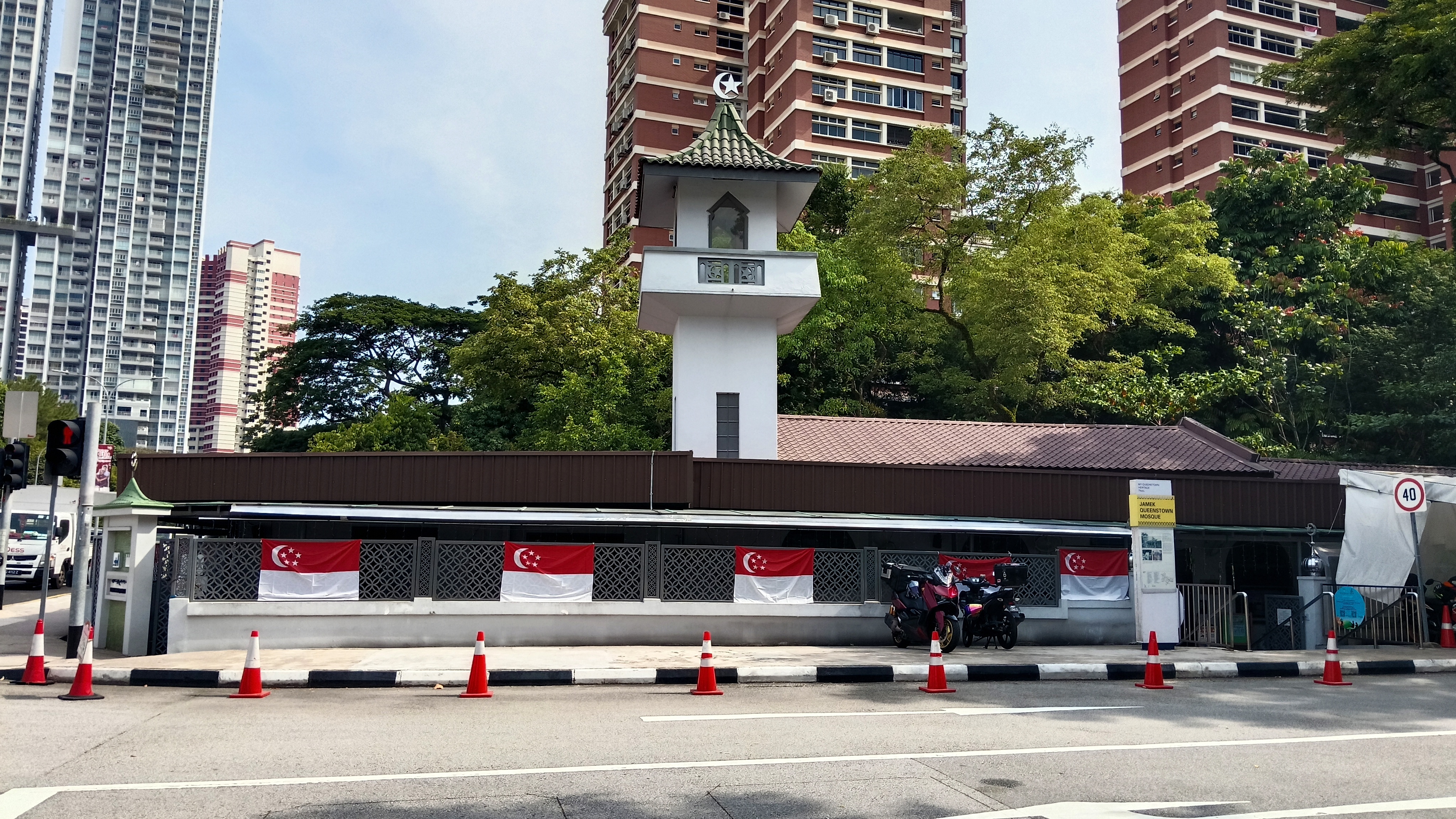

- Location in Singapore

Religion
- Affiliation: Sunni Islam

Location
- Location: 946 Margaret Drive, Singapore 149309
- Country: Singapore
- Coordinates: 1.2929356°N 103.8155859°E

Architecture
- Type: Mosque
- Style: Javanese architecture
- Completed: 1964
- Capacity: 600

Masjid Jamek Queenstown is a congregational mosque located between Tanglin and Queenstown, Singapore. It was first built in 1964 and later renovated in 2017. Like the majority of the mosques in Singapore, it is managed by the Majlis Ugama Islam Singapura (MUIS).

== History ==
In late 1963, residents of Tanglin established a mosque at the intersection of Tanglin Road and Margaret Drive with the approval of the colonial government. Intended to serve as a Jami' ("congregational mosque") for the residents of Tanglin and Queenstown, the mosque was named Masjid Jamek Queenstown, with its name registered into the street directories and database of the Islamic councils. Construction was completed a year later and the mosque was officially opened on 25 December 1964 by Mohammed Khir Johari, then the Malayan Minister for Agriculture and Co-Operatives. After the formation of the Majlis Ugama Islam Singapura (MUIS) in 1968, the mosque fell under the purview of the MUIS and was authorized to serve as a centre for collections of zakat and fidyah payments. With the support of the MUIS, the mosque held forums discussing the spread of practices that were deemed deviant by mainstream Islamic scholarship, such as the Ahmadiyya movement in Singapore.

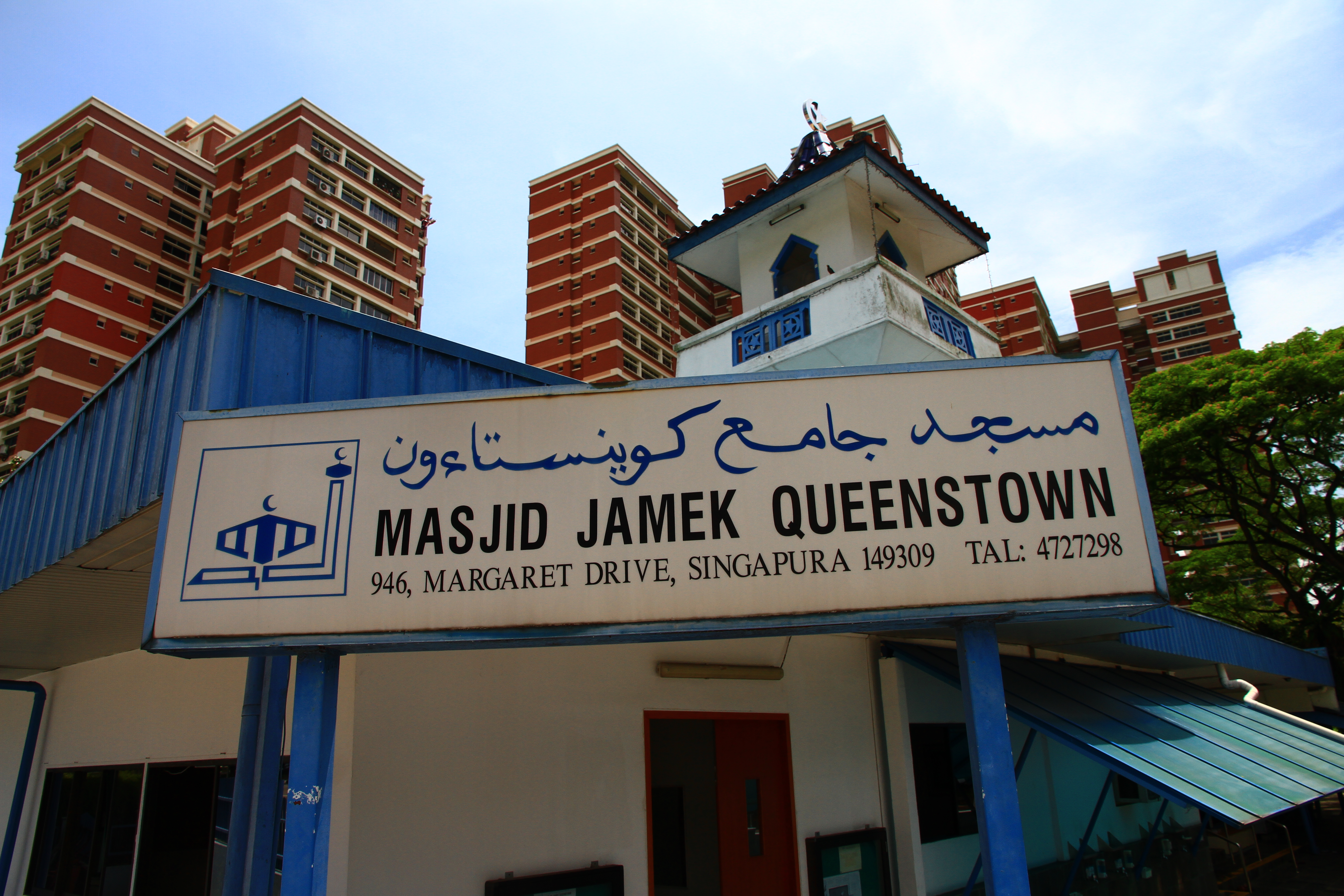
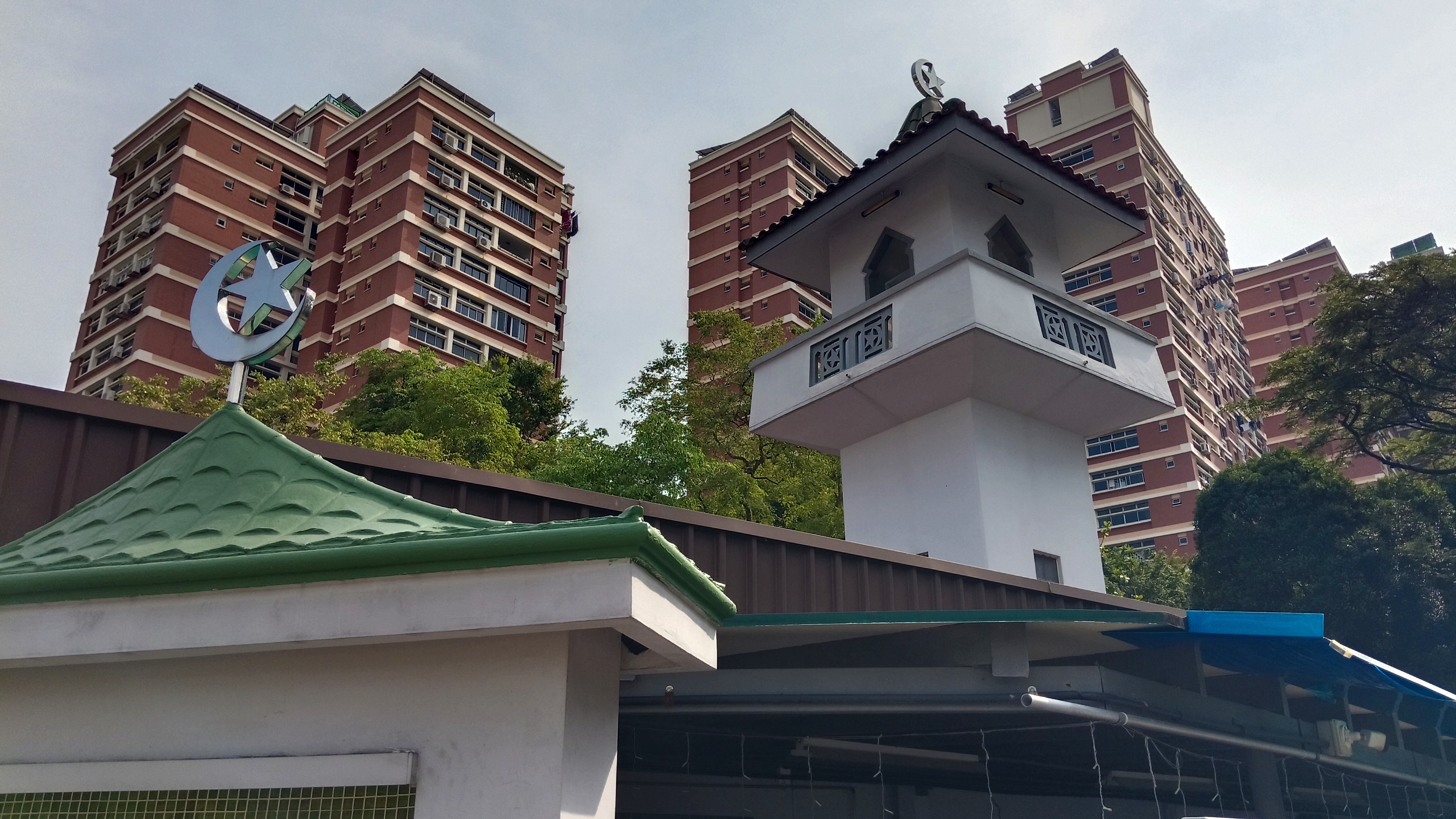
The mosque before and after the 2017 renovation.

In 1993, the ablution areas of the mosque were damaged due to a flood caused by the overflowing Alexandra Canal, resulting in contaminated water seeping into the northernmost ablution facility. The mosque had also been flooded twice beforehand in 1970 and 1980 respectively, with the final flood taking place in 1999 and causing extensive damage to the main prayer hall. To combat the issue of flooding, the land the mosque stood on was lowered downwards, resulting in the mosque being below ground level, but still accessible via staircases. In 2017, the mosque received an extensive renovation adding an air conditioned interior, new toilets, as well as an increased capacity of six hundred worshippers. This renovation was part of a project to rehabilitate three older, smaller mosques in Singapore that had been in a dilapidated condition, including Masjid Hussain Sulaiman and Masjid Tasek Utara, the latter which was completely rebuilt. Architectural firm Hiladt Architects assisted in the renovations of all three mosques.

In 2021, the mosque was closed due to the ongoing pandemic at the time. After the end of the Circuit Breaker period, the mosque was reopened to the wider public and the ruling forbidding shoulder-to-shoulder congregational prayers during the pandemic was recanted.

== Architecture ==
Masjid Jamek Queenstown is built in a contemporary architectural style while including Javanese elements such as the tiered roofs that top the main prayer hall and the minaret. The mosque is recognizable for its blueish theme, which includes the colours of its main walls and the interior of the building. The brick minaret of the mosque stands tall above the main prayer hall, overlooking the courtyard of the mosque. In the western corner of the mosque is the kitchen as well as a carpark.

== Gallery ==
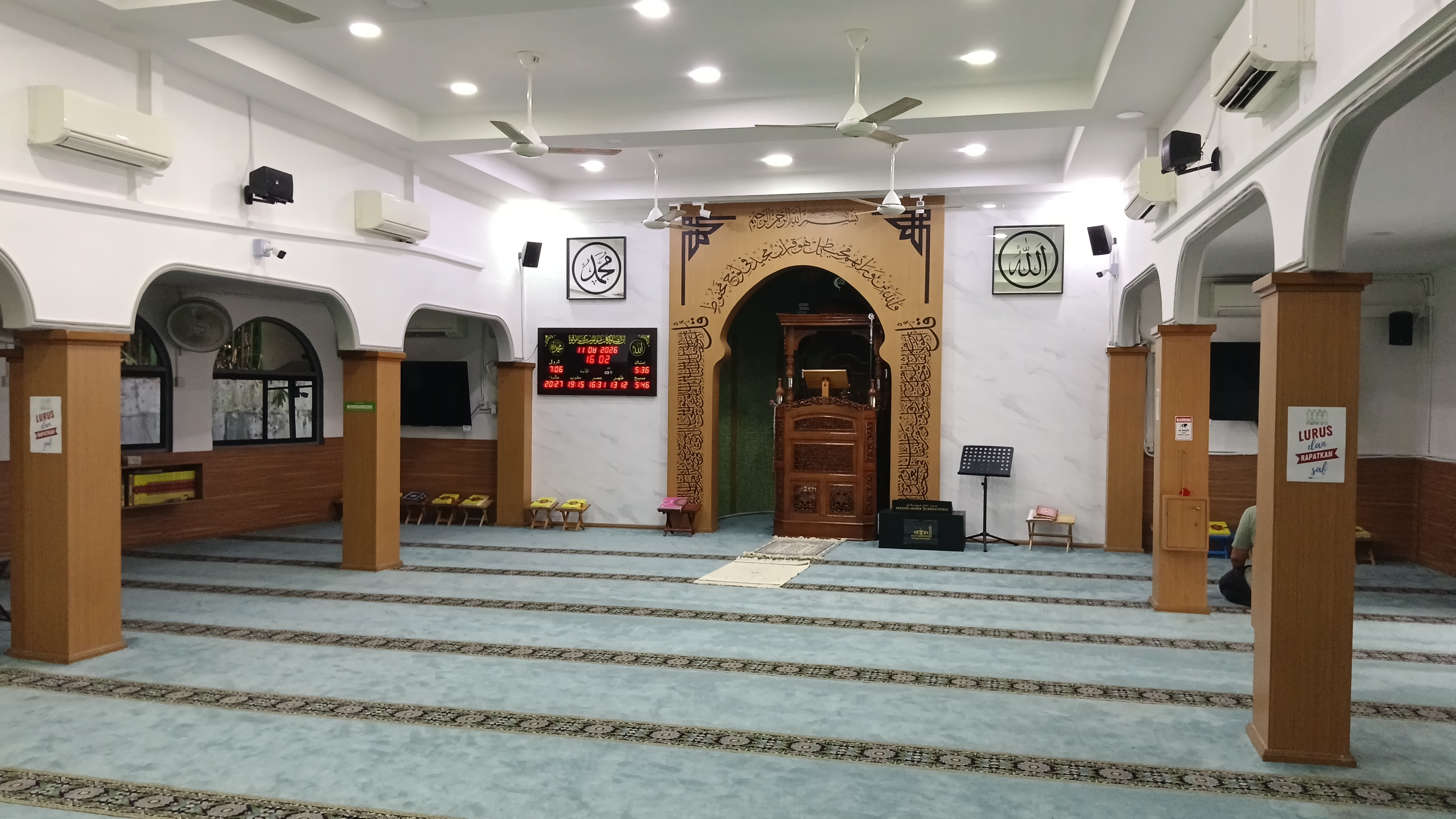
The main prayer hall of the mosque.

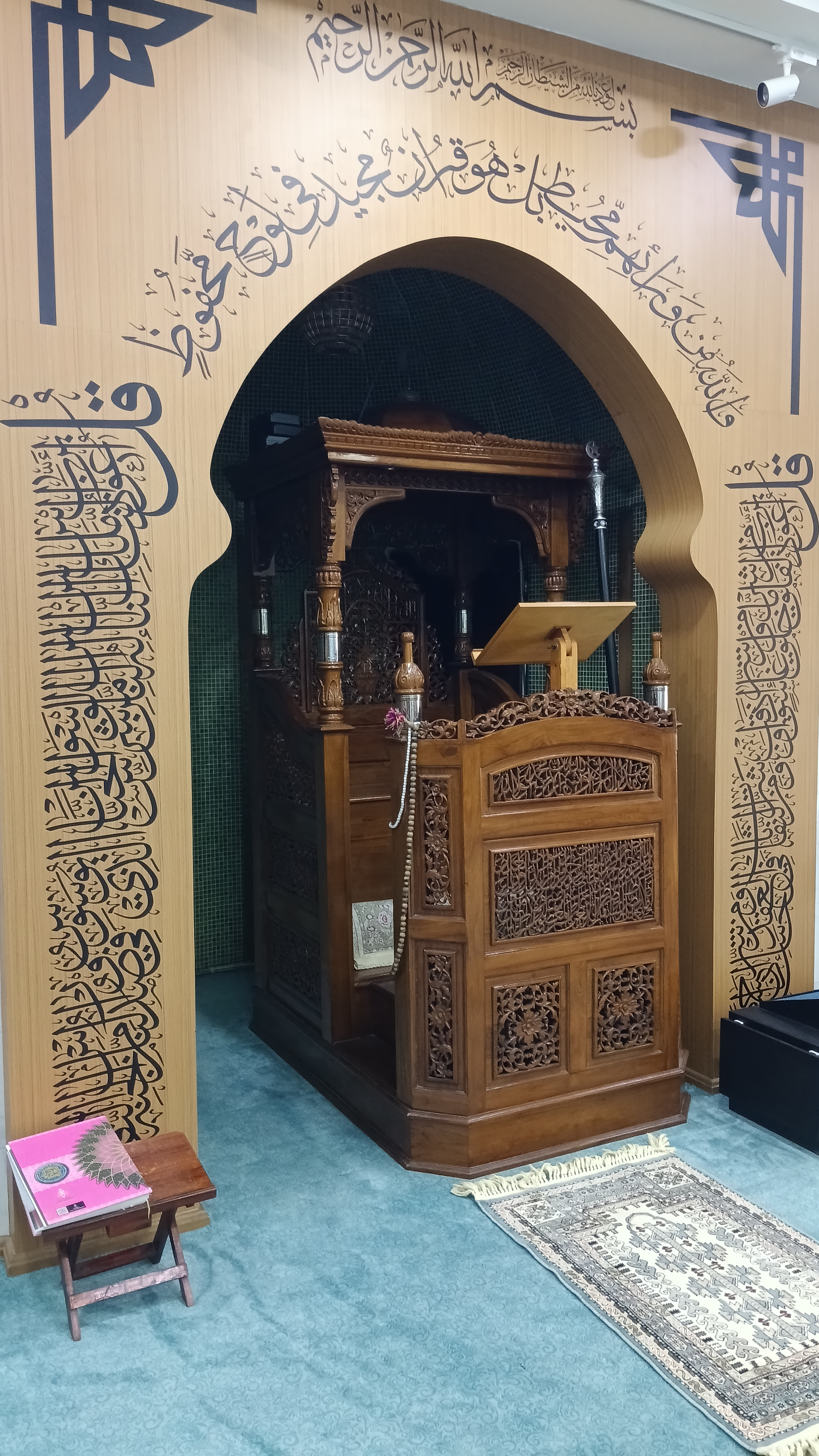
The minbar of the mosque which the preacher stands on to deliver the sermon before the Friday prayer.

== Transportation ==
Masjid Jamek Queenstown is situated at the junction of Margaret Drive and Tanglin Road. The mosque is within walking distance from the Redhill MRT station on the East–West line, while there is also a bus stop that is 190m away from the mosque.

== See also ==
- Islam in Singapore
- List of mosques in Singapore
- 49 Moonstone Lane
