= Kampong Java =

Coordinates: 1°18′48″N 103°51′00″E

- Subzone of Kallang Planning Area

Other transcription(s)
  - Malay: Kampung Jawa (Rumi) کامڤوڠ جاوا (Jawi)
  - Javanese: ꦏꦩ꧀ꦥꦸꦁꦗꦮ (Hanacaraka); Kampung Jawa (Latin)
  - Chinese: 甘榜爪哇; Gānbǎng Zhǎowā (Pinyin); Kam-pōng Jiáu-oa (Hokkien POJ)
  - Tamil: கம்போங் ஜாவா Kampōṅ jāvā (Transliteration)
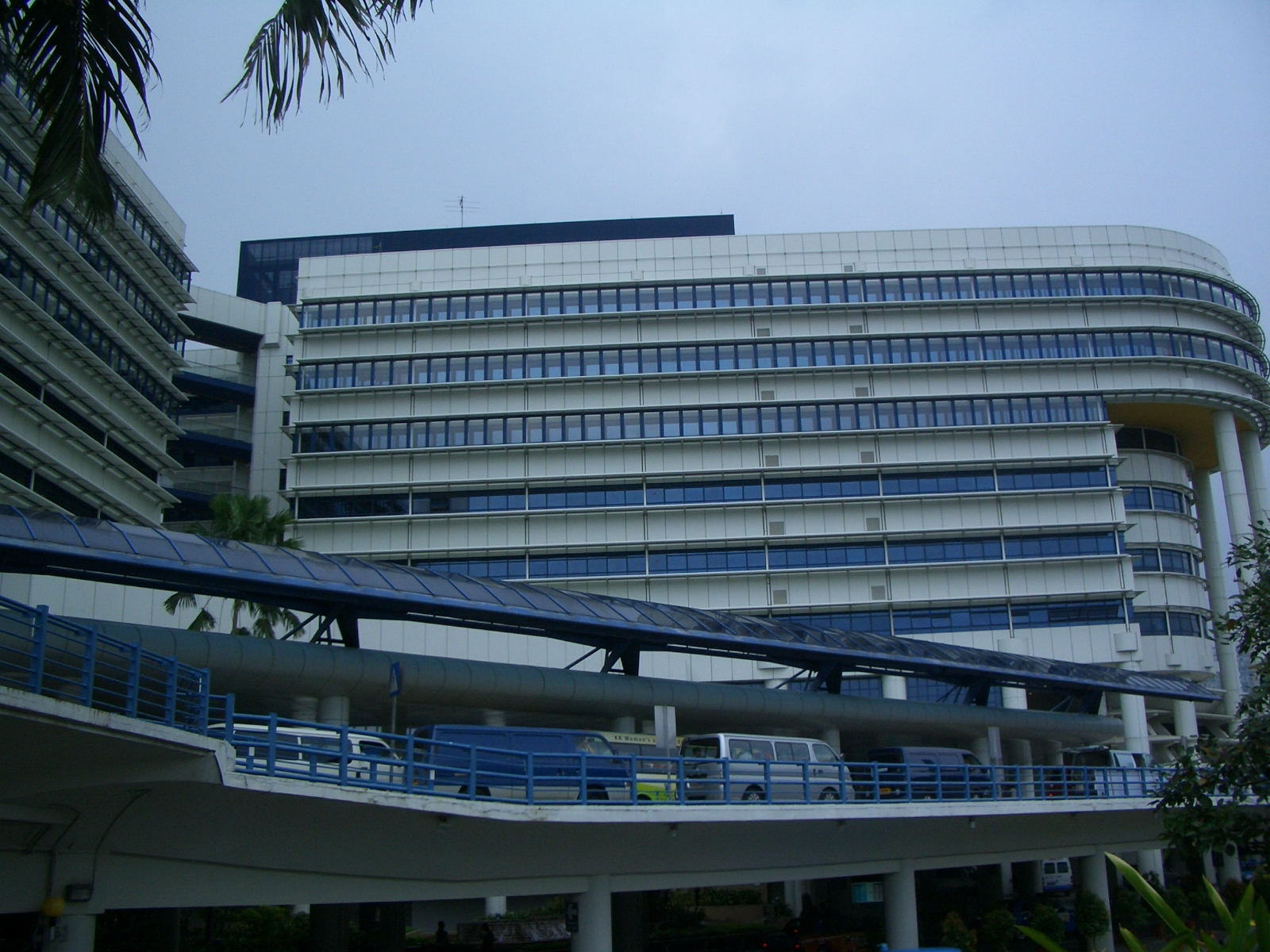
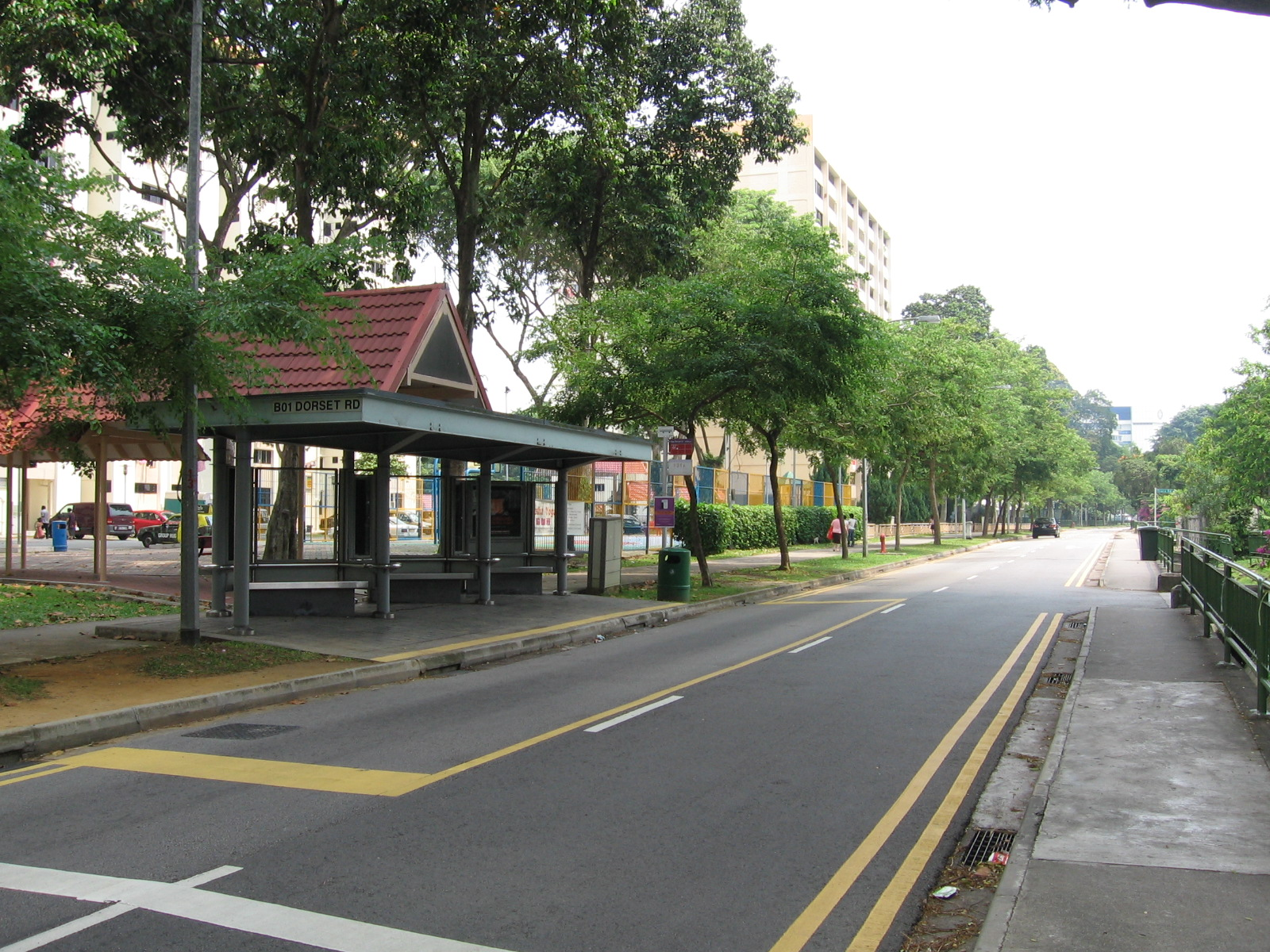
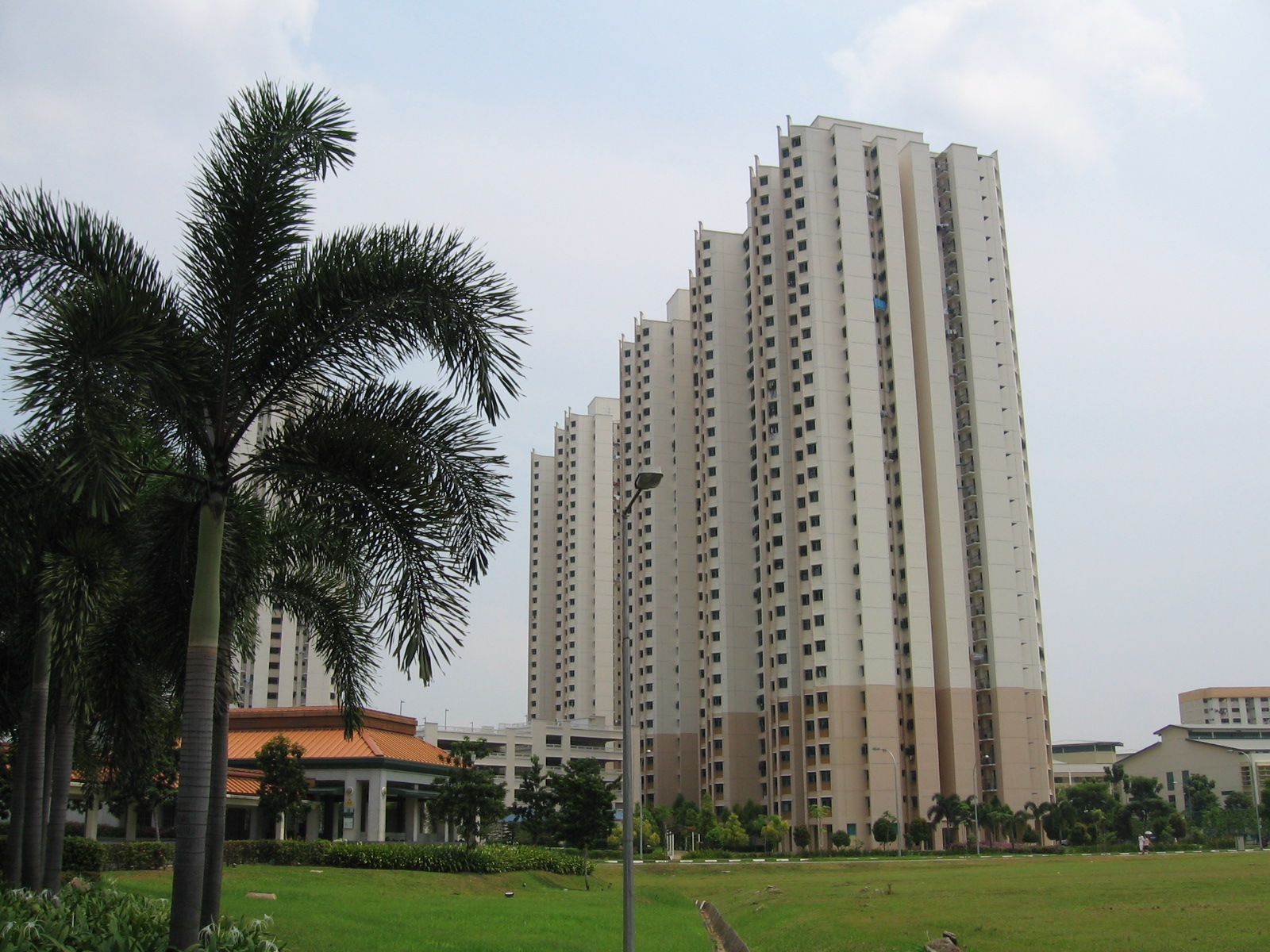
- Row 1: KK Women's and Children's Hospital; Row 2, left: Dorset Road; Row 2, right: Housing and Development Board (HDB) flats on Farrer Park Road with Farrer Park Field in the foreground
- Interactive map of Kampong Java
- Country: Singapore
- Region: Central Region
- Planning Area: Kallang

Kampong Java is a subzone within the planning area of Kallang, Singapore, as defined by the Urban Redevelopment Authority (URA). It is bounded by the Central Expressway (CTE) in the west; Balestier Road in the north; Tessensohn Road, Race Course Road, Gloucester Road, Northumberland Road and Tekka Lane in the east; and Bukit Timah Road in the south.

== Etymology ==
The area is named after the large number of Javanese living in the area, hence Java Village, or Kampong Java.

== Description ==
Kampong Java is probably best known for being the location of KK Women's and Children's Hospital and the headquarters of the Land Transport Authority (LTA). Other significant places within this subzone include the headquarters of Tanglin Police Division, Kampong Java Neighbourhood Police Centre, Pek Kio Community Centre, Balestier Plain, Farrer Park Field, Farrer Park Tennis Centre, the Singapore Indian Association, the Singapore Khalsa Association, Kampong Java Park and Farrer Park Primary School.

Part of the Little India ethnic district stretches into this area. Located within Kampong Java are Little India MRT station and Farrer Park MRT station.

In August 2018, it was announced that Kampong Java Park would be closed to build a facilities building for the North–South Corridor tunnel, an expressway tunnel.
