= Poh Siew Wah =

Singaporean artist (born 1948)

- Born: 30 April 1948 (age 78); Singapore
- Education: Gan Eng Seng Secondary School; Teacher's Training College
- Known for: Abstract art
- Awards: 1981: Consolation Prize, Innovation in Art, SIA/Ministry of Culture, Singapore; 1984/89" Highly Commended UOB Painting of the Year Exhibition; 1984/85: Commended in Australian Art Award, Singapore; 1984/87/88: Distinction in Art Creation Award, NAFA Alumni, Singapore; 1987: Tan Tze Chor Art Award, Singapore Art Society; 1990: Merit Award, IBM Award, Singapore; 1995: Singapore International Foundation (SIF) Overseas Arts Sponsorship Award; National Arts Council (NAC) Travel Grant, Singapore.

Poh Siew Wah (born 30 April 1948) is a Singaporean artist known for his powerful abstract expressionistic styled paintings themed to Singapore and Southeast Asian landscapes. His Rhythmic Exuberance series of paintings also form the main theme for the interiors of the Farrer Park MRT station.

== Early life and education ==
Born in Singapore, Poh first received his art education in Gan Eng Seng Secondary School where he was taught by his teachers, artist S. Namasivayam and Yeong Ah Soo, both encouraging the young Poh to experiment with various art mediums. In 1967, Poh entered the Teacher's Training College, majoring in art education. Even then, this earnestness to experiment in his art-making followed him through College, which opened up his mind to newer techniques and ideas in art. Poh graduated from the college in 1970 and taught art with various schools in Singapore.

== Career ==
Poh is a self-taught artist and inspired by works of the Impressionists and Cubism, which led him to develop his unique style exploring ideas about nature. His major influence came from the works by Spanish artist Antoni Tàpies and he specialised in abstract art and free-form expression works of art in ink.
