= Potong Pasir MRT station =

Mass Rapid Transit station in Singapore

Potong Pasir NE10 波东巴西 போத்தோங் பாசிர்
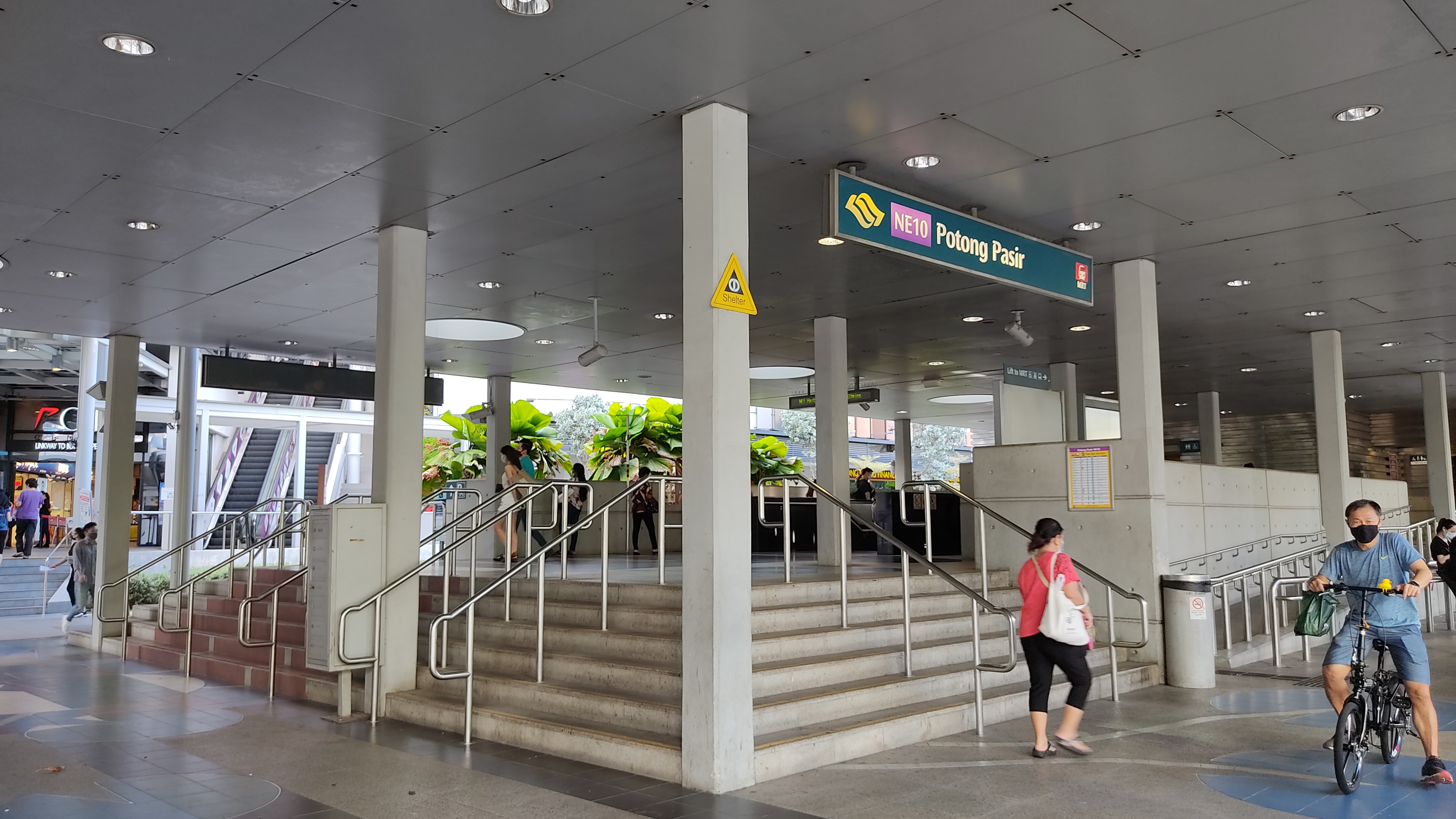
- Exit C of Potong Pasir MRT station in August 2020

General information
- Location: 55 Upper Serangoon Road, Singapore 347694
- Coordinates: 01°19′52″N 103°52′09″E
- System: Mass Rapid Transit (MRT) station
- Owner: Land Transport Authority
- Operator: SBS Transit
- Line: North East Line
- Platforms: 2 (1 island platform)
- Tracks: 2
- Connections: Bus, Taxi

Construction
- Structure type: Underground
- Platform levels: 1
- Parking: Yes (External)
- Accessible: Yes

Other information
- Station code: PTP

History
- Opened: 20 June 2003; 23 years ago
- Former names: Sennett

Passengers
- June 2024: 14,014 per day

Services
Preceding station	Mass Rapid Transit	Following station
Boon Keng towards HarbourFront	North East Line	Woodleigh towards Punggol Coast
Track layout
Location
- Location within Singapore Rail central area

Potong Pasir MRT station is an underground Mass Rapid Transit (MRT) station on the North East Line (NEL) in Toa Payoh planning area, Singapore. It is situated underneath Upper Serangoon Road at the junction with Potong Pasir Avenue 1 and Wan Tho Avenue. Primarily serving the Potong Pasir residential estate, Potong Pasir station is also close to Saint Andrew's Village, a major cluster of educational institutions that are part of the Saint Andrew's family of schools.

The station was first announced as Sennett MRT station in March 1996 when the stations on the NEL were revealed, but was planned to be opened only when there was "sufficient demand". Its closure was a subject of political controversy, with allegations that the station would be opened only when the ruling party managed to take control of the electoral division containing it. In 2002, it was announced that Potong Pasir station would be opened along with the other NEL stations after a new study was conducted; it opened on 20 June 2003.

== History ==
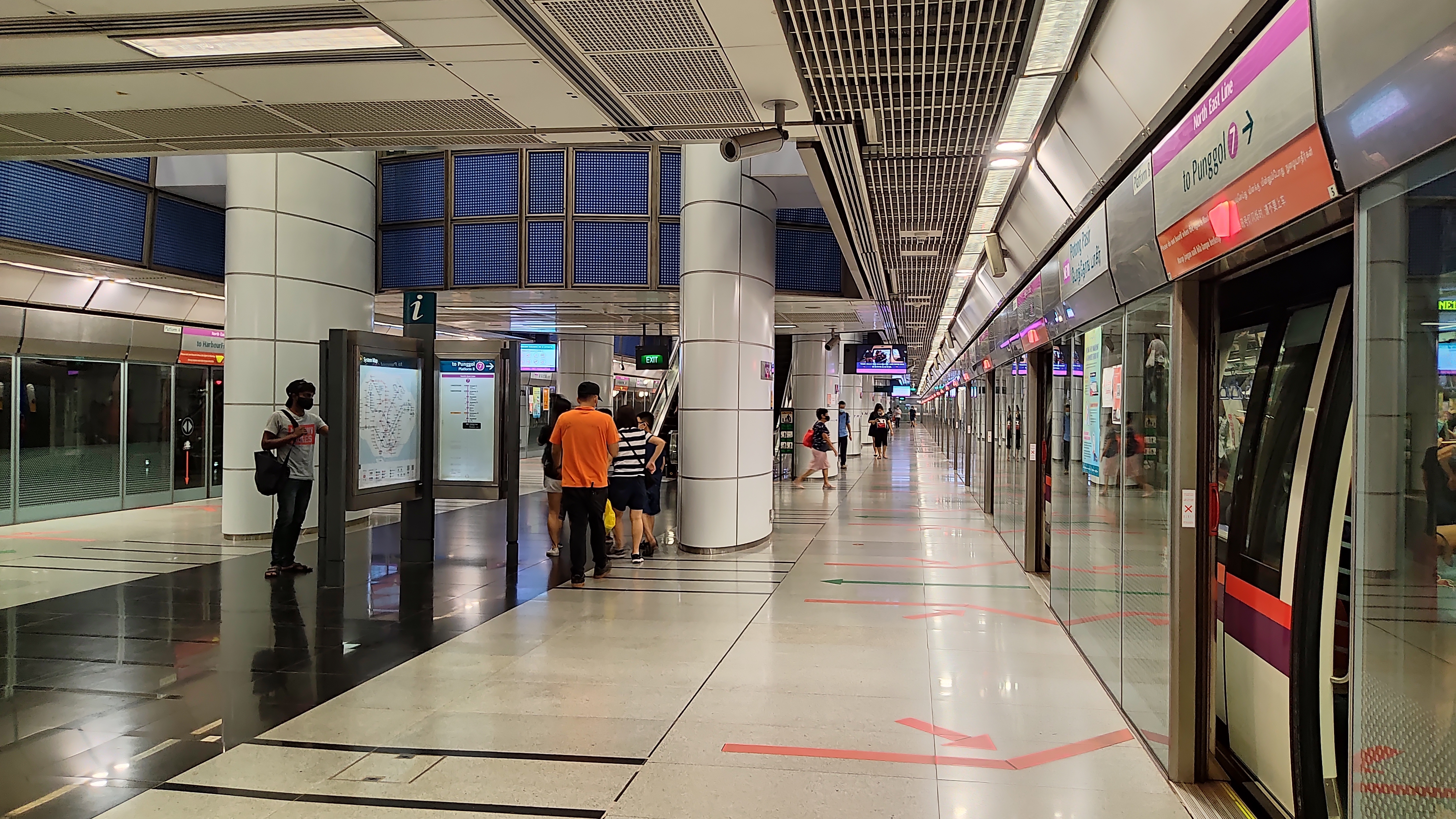
Platform B of Potong Pasir station in December 2020

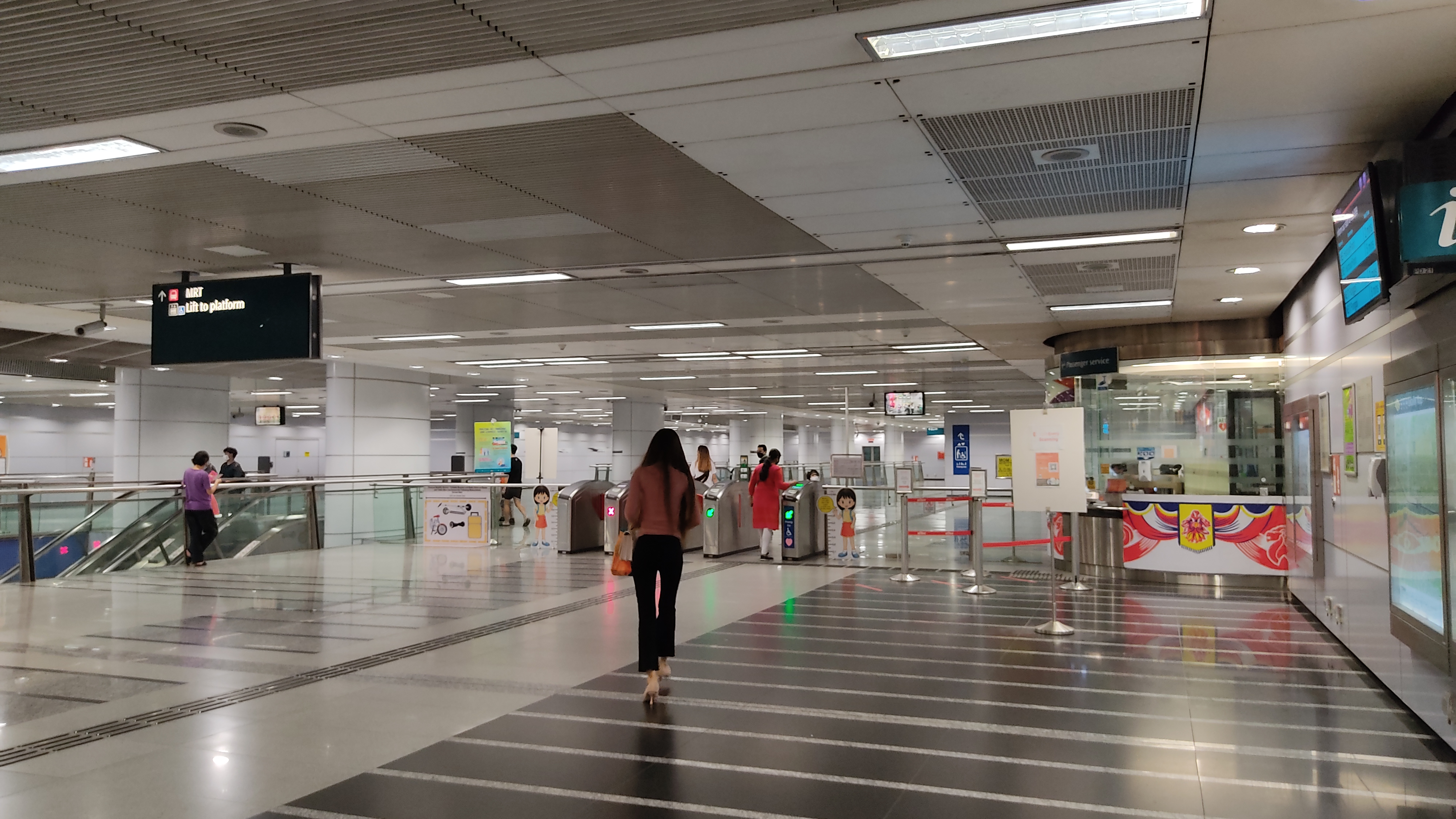
Concourse level of the station in August 2020

In the planning stages of the NEL, it was confirmed by then-Communications Minister Mah Bow Tan in 1995 that the line will pass through the Potong Pasir constituency, then an opposition ward. However, he added that the line would not stop in the constituency as it would not be economically viable. Citing a feasibility study by consultants for the line, he explained that without a station in Potong Pasir, it will reduce costs for the NEL by about S$1 million (US$0.71 million) annually. This was refuted by then Potong Pasir Member of Parliament (MP) Chiam See Tong, who said it would become a "strong station" once there are developments around it.

When the 16 NEL stations were revealed in March 1996, Potong Pasir station was announced as "Sennett" and it was only to be built when its surroundings have been "developed intensely". The residents of Potong Pasir "took in their stride" upon learning of the station's status and alleged that this was due to its location in an opposition constituency.

There were claims that the station (along with Woodleigh, another station in Potong Pasir) would only be opened if a People's Action Party (PAP) (Note: The ruling party of Singapore) candidate managed to secure the constituency. In the 1997 Singapore general elections, PAP candidate Andy Gan had promised residents he would push for the earlier construction of the MRT stations (Potong Pasir and Woodleigh) with the backing of then-deputy prime minister Lee Hsien Loong and other PAP MPs. In response to his opponents' comments, Chiam said that the PAP was trying to "politicise" the MRT issue and he believed that the MRT stations would still be opened, as the land had been acquired for their construction. Then prime minister Goh Chok Tong, who had earlier supported Gan's plans for the MRT construction and said he had the "judgement call" for when they were going to be built, later said that there was "no guarantee" the constituency will get the MRT station even if the PAP secures the constituency during the 2001 Singaporean general elections.

Eventually, it was announced by then Transport Minister Yeo Cheow Tong in February 2002 that the station will be opened with the other NEL stations and the name was finalised as Potong Pasir. Yeo insisted the decision was "based strictly on ridership levels" through a recent review by the Land Transport Authority (LTA) on projected ridership levels for the NEL stations. The government had denied that the station's opening was related to PAP's bigger share of votes in the 2001 general elections.

Contract 705 for the design and construction of the Boon Keng and Potong Pasir two-level civil defence underground stations, 1.8 kilometres (1.1 miles) of twin bored tunnels and 280 metres (920 ft) of cut and cover tunnels, was awarded to Kumagai Gumi-Sembawang Engineering-Mitsui Joint Venture at a contract value of S$217 million (US$146.15 million). Initially, the station was planned to be just a "shell station", but it was decided to build the whole station as it would be more expensive for the station to be fitted later.

The station was constructed using the top-down method. The construction works required the acquisition of a row of shophouses along Upper Serangoon Road. During the construction, residents had complained about the noise generated from the site, which the LTA Corporate Communications Department answered promptly by giving residents explanations on the works.

The station commenced operations on 20 June 2003. Commenting on its opening, Chiam has said it was "not so much a victory for me as a victory for the people of Potong Pasir." Chiam's rival, Sitoh Yih Pin, has mentioned he was "happy for the residents as they will benefit from the convenience." He mentioned that he had urged the Senior Minister of State for Transport to consider its opening, despite the PAP's loss in the 2001 elections. The residents has also welcomed the station's opening, for it would bring more visitors and businesses to the area.

== Station details ==
=== Name and location ===
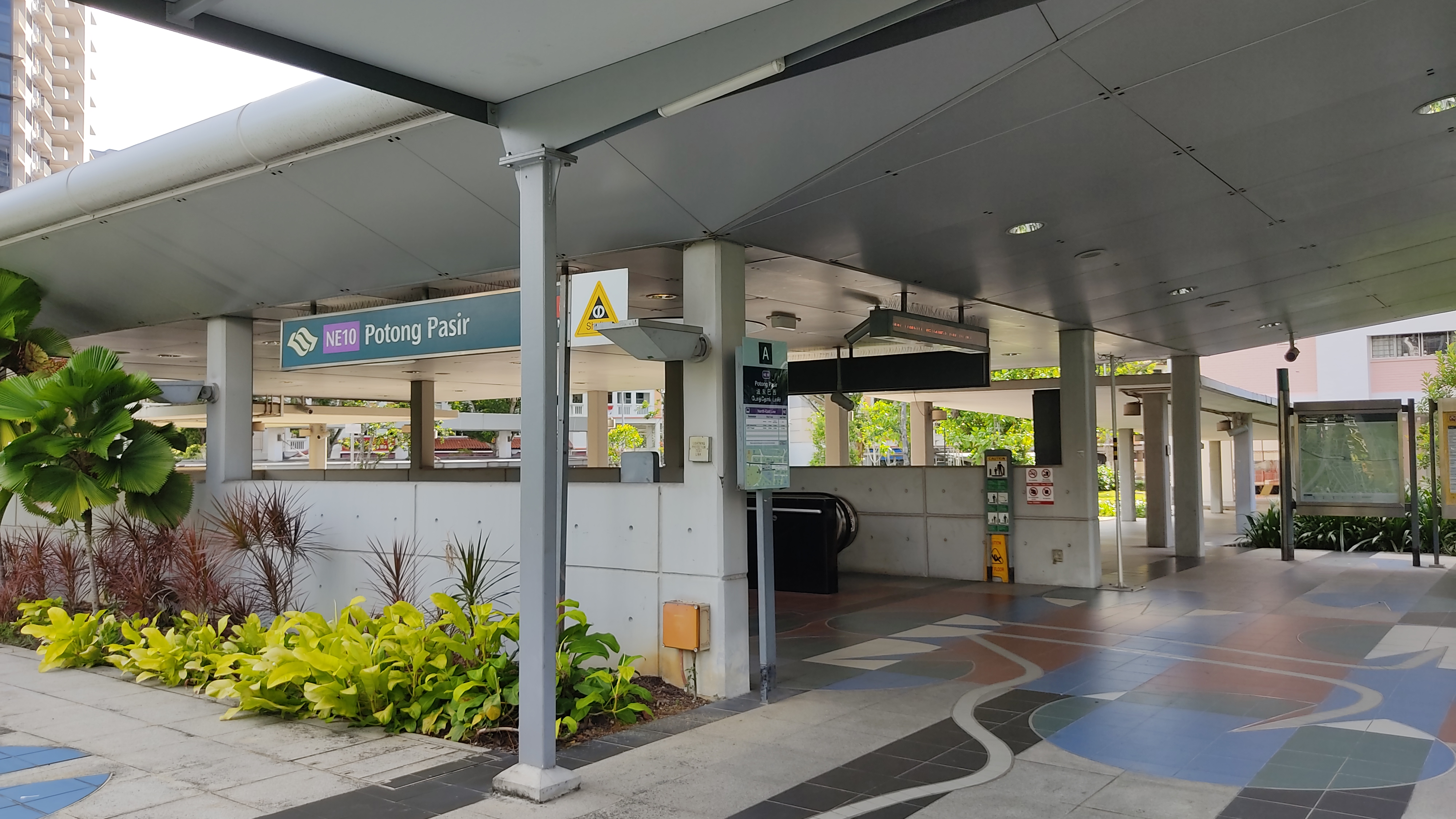
Exit A of the station in August 2020

As the name suggests, Potong Pasir station is located in Potong Pasir underneath Upper Serangoon Road. The name Potong Pasir means "cut sand" in Malay, referring to the former activities of sand quarries in the area.

Before its construction, the station had "Sennett" as its working name. Sennett was taken from former British Commissioner of Lands C.W.A Sennett, who was also a land and housing developer. According to then PAP's second advisor to Potong Pasir Andy Gan, Sennett had a "better historical standing" and reminds residents of the area of their "past glory". The name was also seen as controversial, seen as a measure by the government to not "remind people that (the station) is (located) in an opposition stronghold". The name was eventually finalised as "Potong Pasir" in February 2002.

The station is near landmarks such as the Potong Pasir Community Club, Masjid Alkaff (Upper Serangoon), the Muslim Trust Fund Association, the Sri Sivadurga Temple and the St. Andrews' Village which includes the schools of St. Andrew's Junior College, St. Andrew's Junior School and the St. Andrew's Secondary School. It also serves the residential properties of the Nin Residence, Saint Ritz, the Sennett Estate and the Sennett Residence, in addition to the Potong Pasir Estate. It is also situated next to the retail development of the Poiz Centre.

=== Services ===
The station serves the North East Line and is situated between the Boon Keng and Woodleigh stations. The station code is NE10 on official maps. The station operates daily from about 6:00 am to 12:15 am. Train frequencies vary from 2.5 to 5 minutes depending on peak hours.

=== Public artwork ===
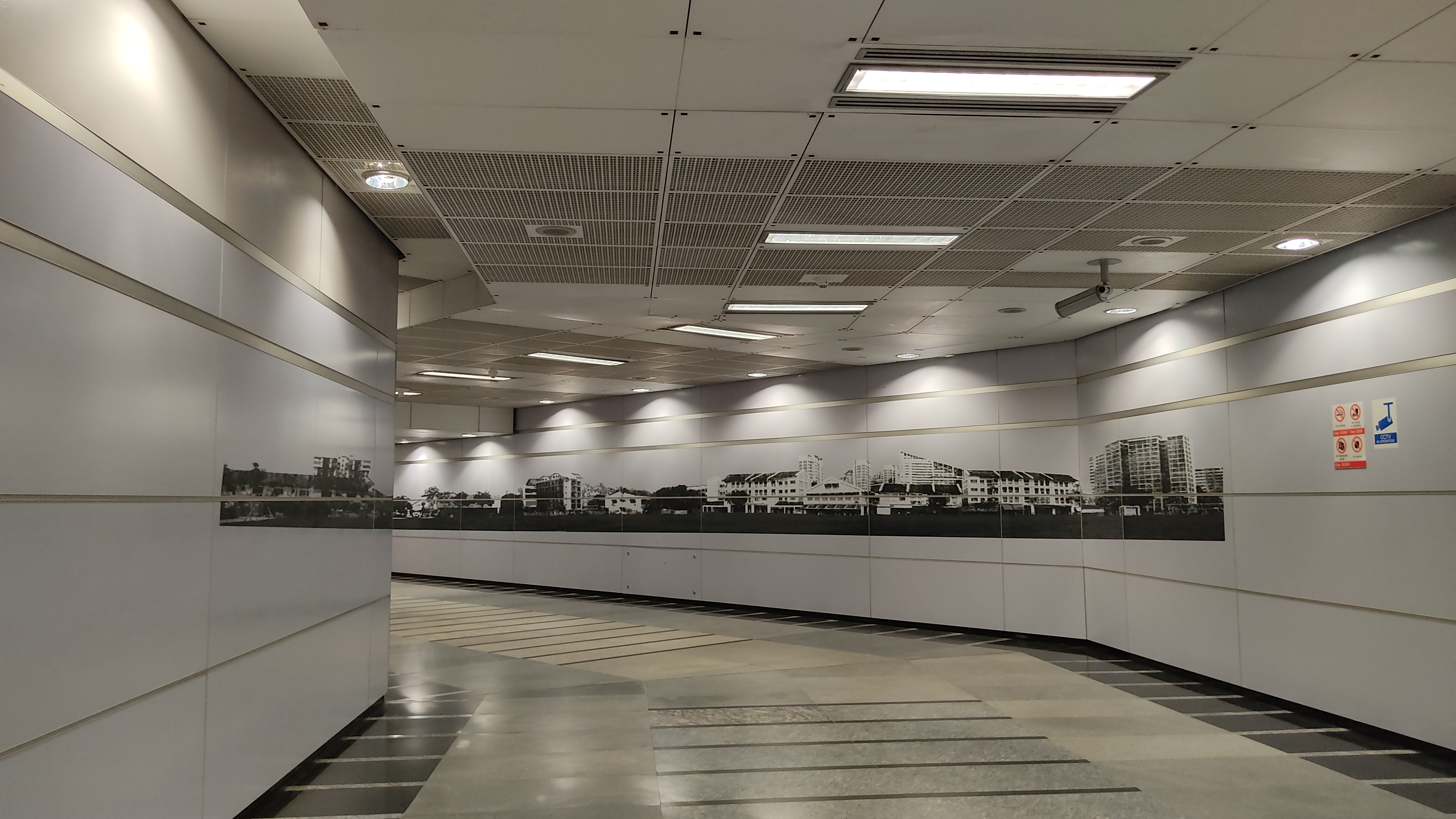
An anamorphic image of a row of HDB blocks, in a passageway leading to Exit A of the station

Commissioned as part of the MRT system's Art-in-Transit Programme, (Note: Public art showcase which integrates artworks into the MRT network) Point of View by Matthew Ngui is a series of anamorphic images and text displayed all around the station. These texts and images, or according to the artist the "macro view of the images with the microcosmic perspective of the text", gives the work aesthetic interest and depth. The seven images include a row of Housing Development Board (HDB) apartments displayed along a passageway, a tree at the north side of the concourse and a bus stop at the south side of the concourse. On the platforms, there are four images of clocks set at various times of day (morning, midday, evening and night) alongside some texts. These images were chosen to represent daily life.

When starting out on the work, the artist considered heavily on LTA's call for "an intriguing work that would engage the community". Ngui wished to engage the public in a purposeful way, by allowing various members of the public to contribute text and images for the work. The artist still focussed on certain subject matters that would be relevant to people of various ages. For example, the tree image represents growth for the youth. For the text fragments, Ngui had urged the participants to write about issues "closest to them" so as to produce text relevant to the masses. These texts were then converted into graffitied words. Putting the work together, three supporting features were employed – explanation panels, video images played on the plasma screens and granite floor pointers from which it is best to view the images. Reflecting on the work, the artist said that this work "creates something that does not look like what it is" until it "resolves itself" when viewed from a certain point of view. He felt it was an interesting art piece "with a serious side", for people to interpret what they wanted.

== Exits ==
- A: Potong Pasir Estate
- B: Masjid Alkaff (Upper Serangoon), Muslim Trust Fund Association, Nin Residence, Saint Ritz, Sennett Estate, Sennett Residence
- C: Potong Pasir Community Club, Sri Sivadurga Temple, St. Andrew's Junior College, St. Andrew's Junior School, St. Andrew's Secondary School, The Poiz Residences, Moonstone Lane
