= Masjid Hussain Sulaiman =

Mosque in Pasir Panjang, Singapore

- Jawi: مسجد حسين سليمان
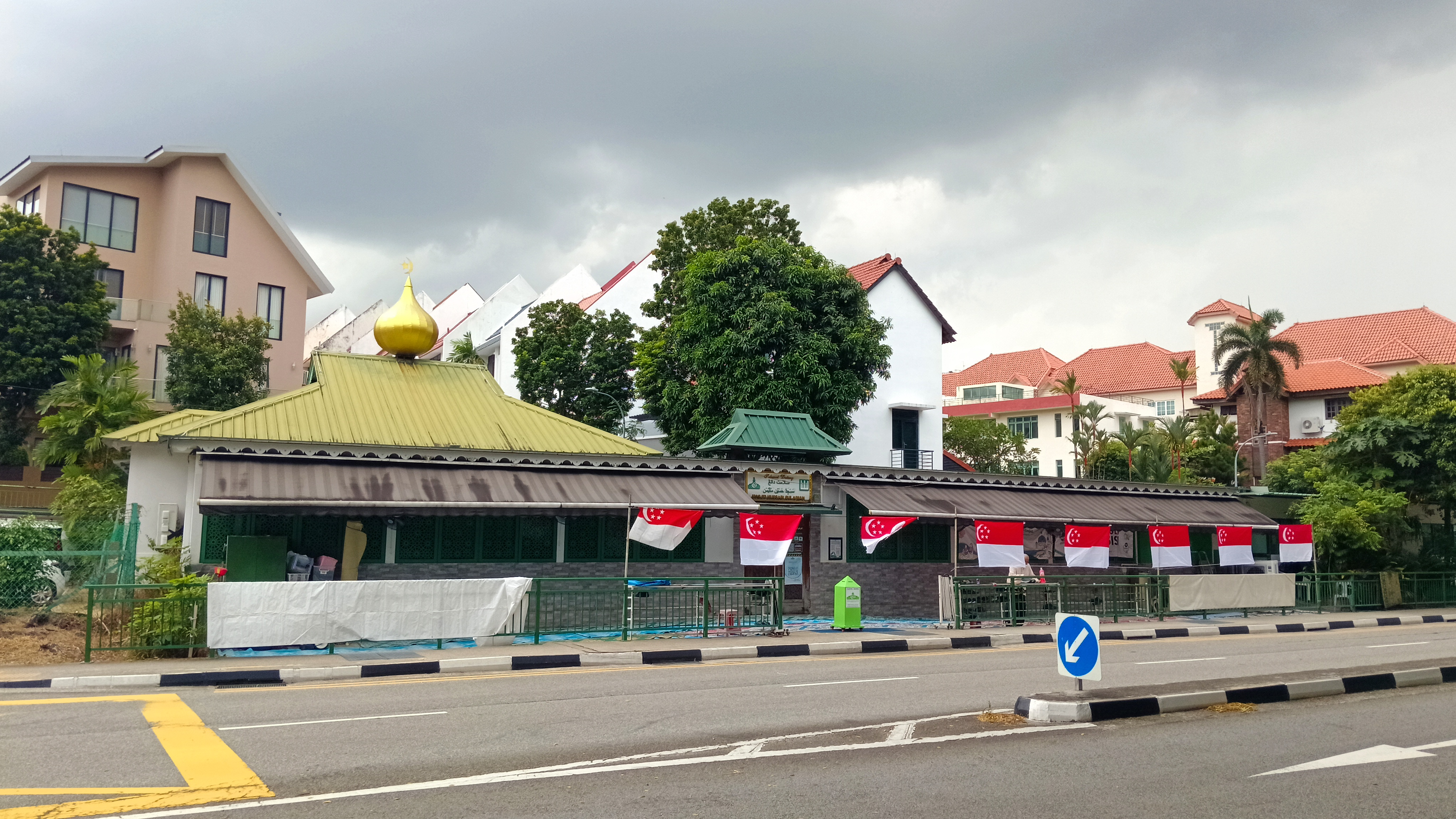

- Location in Singapore

Religion
- Affiliation: Sunni Islam

Location
- Location: 394 Pasir Panjang Road, Singapore 118730
- Country: Singapore
- Coordinates: 1.2912643°N 103.7717029°E

Architecture
- Architect: Hiladt Architects (for renovation only)
- Type: Mosque
- Style: Islamic architecture
- Founder: Hussain bin Sulaiman
- Completed: 1902 (Surau); 1940 (Mosque)
- Dome: 1

Masjid Hussain Sulaiman, alternatively known as the Green Mosque, is a mosque located in the Pasir Panjang district of southern Queenstown, Singapore. Originating in 1902 as a surau, it is named after its founder, Hussain bin Sulaiman. It is recognizable amongst locals for its predominately green colour scheme.

== History ==
In the late 1890s, a merchant named Hussain bin Sulaiman gathered funds from villagers in the Pasir Panjang area to build a surau, which was completed in 1902. The surau was rebuilt in 1940 as a proper mosque and remained in service during the Second World War. The Majlis Ugama Islam Singapura (MUIS) named the mosque after its original founder and inaugurated it into a list of approved mosques for the collections of Zakat al-Fitr by early 1970. The mosque received several reconstructions between 1990 and 2001, with the year 1992 seeing an addition of a prayer hall for female worshippers. It was also painted in a predominately green colour scheme, leading to it being named the Green Mosque and allowing to be an easily recognizable landmark by the residents of Pasir Panjang. The general shape and structure of the main prayer hall of the mosque has remained the same since 1940, with the exception of the dome which was added to the roof in 2000. In 2008, the mosque had reportedly started to show signs of aging, such as cracks in the walls of the main prayer hall.

A keramat shrine and Islamic cemetery also existed in the street opposite the mosque, centred around two graves belonging to Muslim sages, one of them named Dato Raja Mulia. The keramat, which was visited by both Malay and Chinese devotees, was demolished in 1990 along with the cemetery and the bodies were reinterred in the Pusara Aman Muslim Cemetery.

In 2017, Masjid Hussain Sulaiman received a major facelift and renovation, as part of a project to upgrade three smaller mosques that had been former suraus. The other two mosques were Masjid Jamek Queenstown and Masjid Tasek Utara, the latter which was completely rebuilt. Architectural firm Hiladt Architects assisted in the renovations of all three mosques.

== Transportation ==
Masjid Hussain Sulaiman is situated along Pasir Panjang Road and shares a bus stop with the Pasir Panjang Post Office that is next to the mosque.

== See also ==
- List of mosques in Singapore
