= Farrer Park MRT station =

Mass Rapid Transit station in Singapore

Farrer Park NE8 花拉公园 ஃபேரர் பார்க்
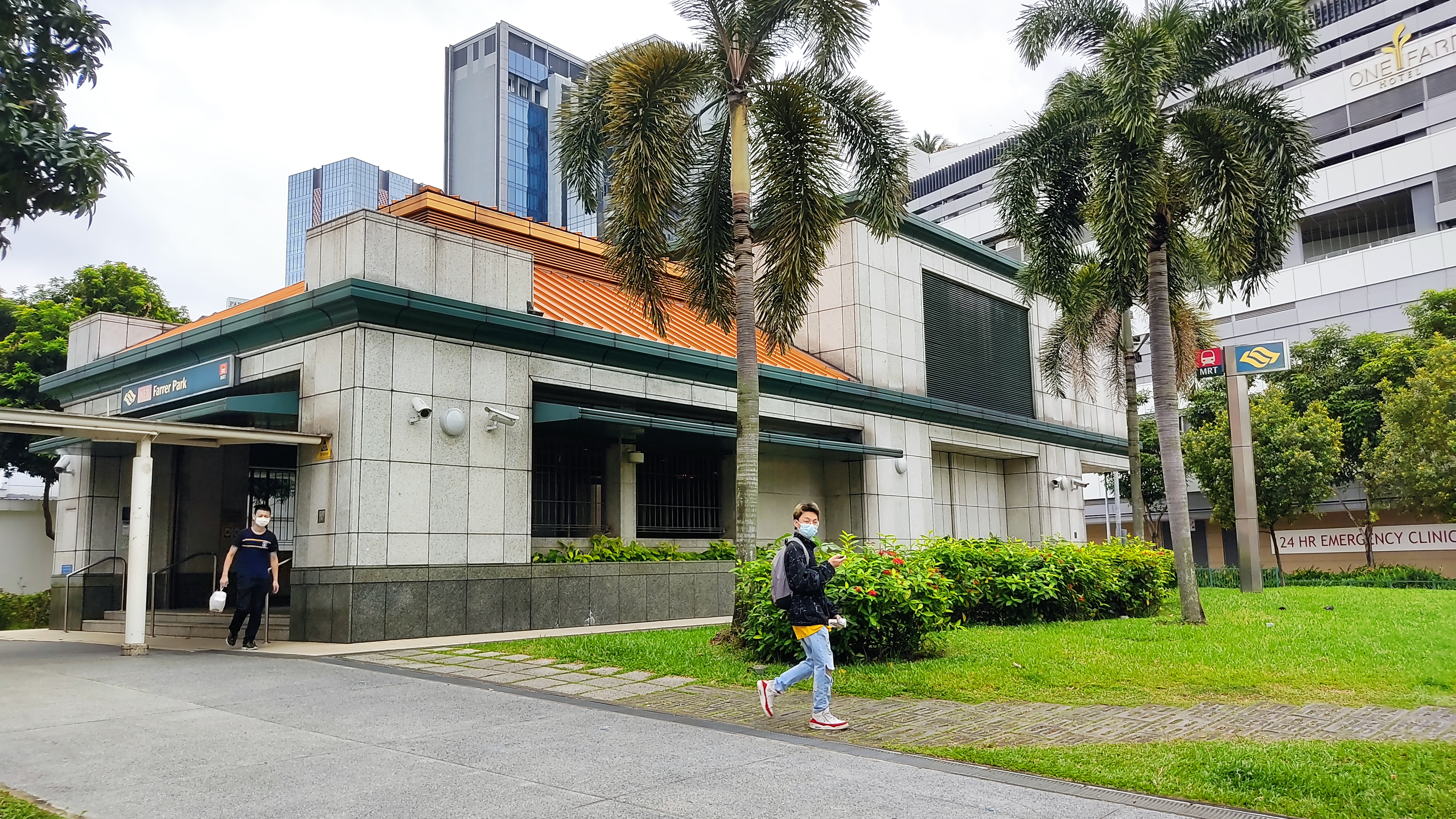
- Exit B of Farrer Park MRT station.

General information
- Location: 250 Race Course Road, Singapore 218703
- Coordinates: 01°18′44″N 103°51′15″E
- System: Mass Rapid Transit (MRT) station
- Owner: Land Transport Authority
- Operator: SBS Transit
- Line: North East Line
- Platforms: 2 (1 island platform)
- Tracks: 2
- Connections: Bus, Taxi

Construction
- Structure type: Underground
- Platform levels: 1
- Accessible: Yes

Other information
- Station code: FRP

History
- Opened: 20 June 2003; 23 years ago

Services
Preceding station	Mass Rapid Transit	Following station
Little India towards HarbourFront	North East Line	Boon Keng towards Punggol Coast
Track layout
Location
- Location within Singapore Rail central area

Farrer Park MRT station is an underground Mass Rapid Transit (MRT) station along the North East Line (NEL), located on the boundary of Kallang and Rochor planning areas, Singapore. To facilitate its construction, several buildings in its vicinity had to be shut down and vacated. Despite this, residents alongside Tessensohn Road and Starlight Terrace asked for more time to move. The significant concentration of marine clay in the ground and its proximity to Little India proved to be challenges in its construction, due to the risk of building damage. The station opened on 20 June 2003 in tandem with the rest of the NEL.

It is one of the two stations that serve the ethnic district of Little India. The station sits underneath the Connexion building, Farrer Park Hospital and One Farrer Hotel. Rhythmic Exuberance by Poh Siew Wah is displayed at this station as part of the Art-in-Transit programme. Rhythmic Exurberance consists of a mix of realistic and abstract forms. It consists of five murals depicting various sports, highlighting Farrer Park's history as a sports hub prior to World War II.

== History ==
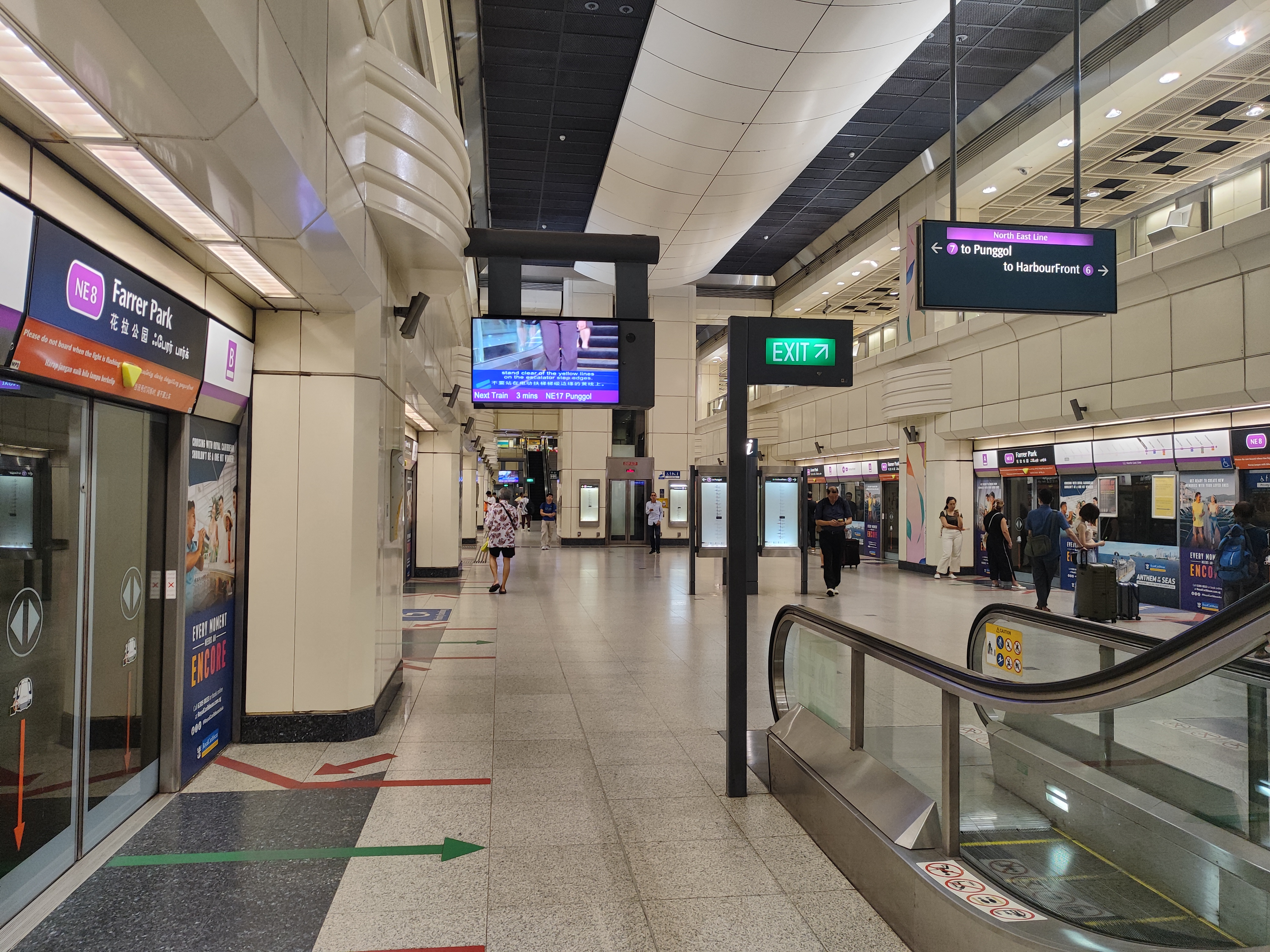
Station platform level

The North East Line (NEL) project, which was first proposed in 1984, received government approval in January 1996. Farrer Park station was among the sixteen NEL stations announced by communications minister Mah Bow Tan that March.

Several properties surrounding the station were acquired by the government ahead of its construction, and the owners were notified to vacate by March 1997. However, some residents along Tessensohn Road and Starlight Terrace requested additional time to move. Shopowners along Rangoon Road and Owen Road also expressed the need for more time to find suitable new premises, citing considerations such as location, cost, and size. In August 1996, the government granted a six-month extension to owners of 51 lots affected by the Tessensohn Road widening project, while the remaining property owners were still required to vacate by the original deadline.

Contract C706 for the design and construction of Farrer Park station was awarded to a joint venture between Hyundai Engineering & Construction and Zublin AG for S$311.56 million (US$209.8 million) in April 1997. The contract also included the construction of the adjacent Kandang Kerabau station. In November 1997, a section of Race Course Road was converted into a two-way street, while part of Hampshire Road was closed. Before tunelling works could commence, a jet-grouted block had to be constructed to support a diaphragm wall's toe above it. Due to the presence of a significant layer of marine clay beneath the tunnels, the initial ground stiffness is insufficient to limit the heave within the required thresholds. Various traffic diversions had to be carried out in phases to minimise inconvenience for commuters, such as the relocation of bus stops and traffic lights. This is due to the station site's proximity to Little India, which can potentially damage nearby buildings.

When tunnelling between Little India and Farrer Park stations, the heritage buildings along Race Course Road required protection against ground settlement. As these buildings were built on "strip footings" and shallow timber piles, they were supported by the installation of metal supports and were being closely observed for any movement. An old church near the tunnel excavation works, Foochow Methodist Church, was built on a combination of timber and H-piles, which caused uneven settlement and cracks to appear on the church walls. As a safety precaution, the church attendees temporarily relocated to the nearby Rex Cinema while the LTA and church engineers strengthened the church foundation with steel supports and micropiles. Farrer Park station opened on 20 June 2003.

== Station details ==
Located between Rangoon Road and Gloucester Road, Farrer Park station is close to Farrer Park Hospital, City Square Mall and Mustafa Centre. Farrer Park also serves Farrer Park Primary School, Masjid Angullia and Sri Srinivasa Perumal Temple. The station is served by the NEL, between Little India and Boon Keng stations, and has the station code "NE8". As part of the NEL, it is operated by SBS Transit. The station operates between 6:02 am (6:22 am on Sunday and public holidays) and 11:48 pm, with train services varying between 2.5 and 5 minutes. Confusion of this station with another station on the Circle Line, Farrer Road, sparked a proposal to rename the station to "New World" or "Kitchener" station in 2011. Farrer Park MRT station has eight exits – the most on the NEL.

Like most NEL stations, Farrer Park is a designated Civil Defence shelter. It is designed to accommodate at least 7,500 people and can withstand airstrikes and chemical attacks. Equipment essential for the operations in the Civil Defence shelter is mounted on shock absorbers to prevent damage during a bombing. When the electrical supply to the shelter is disrupted, there are backup generators to keep operations going. The shelter has dedicated built-in decontamination chambers and dry toilets with collection bins that will send human waste out of the shelter.

The station has accessibility features. A tactile system, consisting of tiles with rounded or elongated raised studs, guides visually impaired commuters through the station, with dedicated routes that connect the station entrances to the platforms or between the lines. Wider fare gates allow easier access for wheelchair users into the station.

=== Artwork ===
Commissioned as part of the MRT network's Art-in-Transit programme, Rhythmic Exuberance by Poh Siew Wah is displayed at this station. The work consists of five sets of vitreous enamel murals illustrating a range of sports including football, swimming and athletics, referencing Farrer Park's history as a sports hub before World War II. A set, featuring horse racing, also pays tribute to the area's history as the site of Singapore's first turf club. A mural near one of the station entrances, Aeroplane, depicts the first aeroplane landing in Singapore in 1911 at Old Racecourse Road.

For the commission, the artist drew upon personal childhood memories of the area and historical research, including walks through Farrer Park and visits to the National Archives. The work blends figurative and abstract styles through black ink brush drawings, using curvilinear shapes and swirling lines to create images that appear light and graceful. The artist explained "the language of movement and rhythm" as a common element in both styles, citing the trace of a running figure in his artwork.

Poh initially crumpled the paper, creating jagged edges and uneven textures to avoid the brush strokes from becoming "too neat" and provide a contrast to the "more precise" abstract elements. He used his entire arm to create shapes in a single motion with a Chinese brush. For the abstract elements, the artist worked with coloured paper, cutting out shapes to produce sharp, well-defined lines. The black brush drawings on white panels contrasted against pastel-toned abstracts, which were chosen to create a light, calming atmosphere in the station. The tonal gradation of these colours was intended to add depth and spaciousness. The work was produced in a factory in Zaragoza, Spain, which experimented with various methods to best match the artist's original colours.

== Bibliography ==
- Leong, Chan Teik (2003). Getting There: The Story of the North East Line. Singapore: Land Transport Authority. ISBN 981-04-5886-X. OCLC 53383062.
- Tan, Su Yen (2003). Art in transit: North East Line MRT. Singapore: Land Transport Authority. ISBN 981-04-7384-2. OCLC 52771106.
