= Settlement (structural) =

Sinking of a building foundation

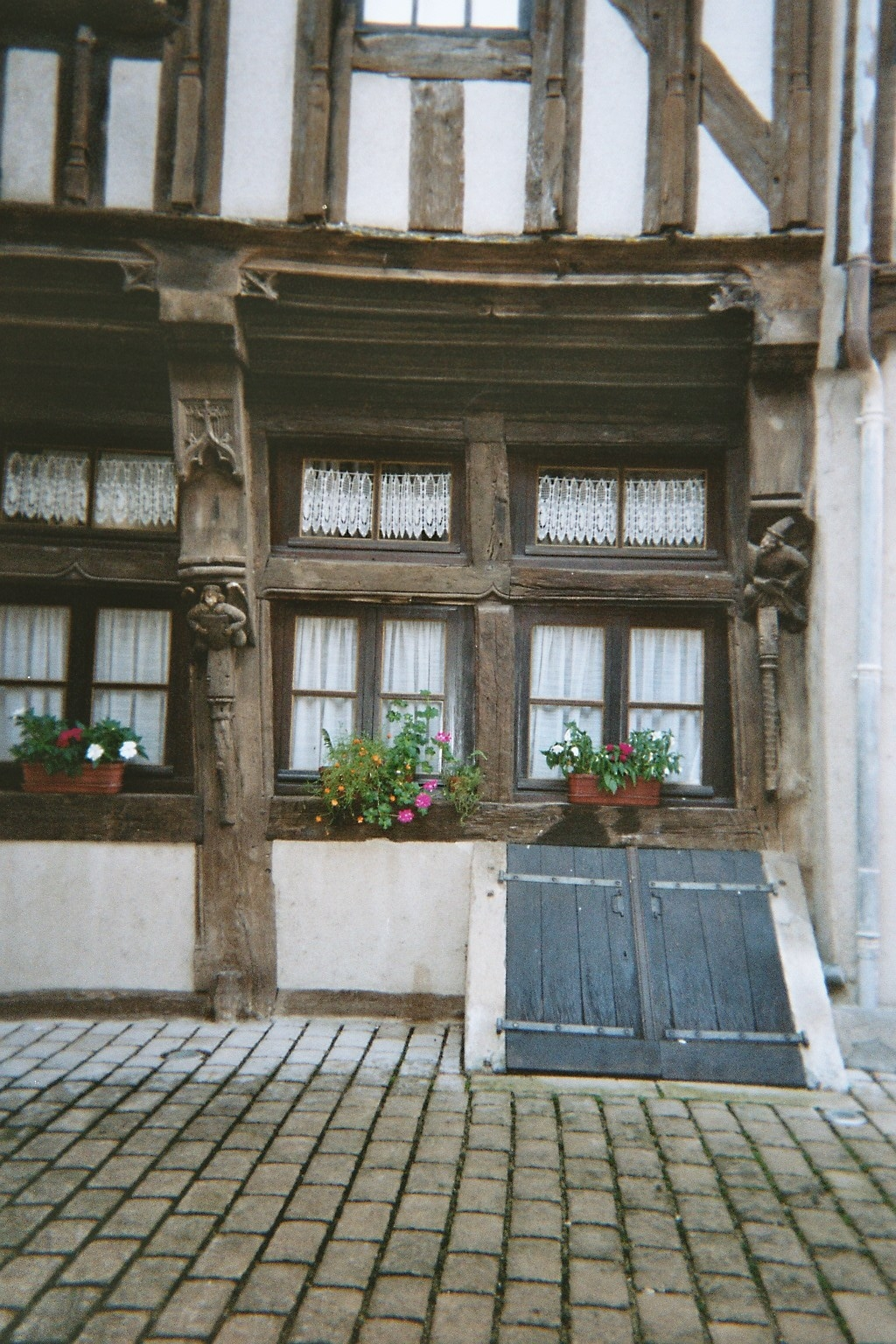
Timber-frame building showing considerable, but tolerable, settlement

Settlement is the downward movement or the sinking of a structure's foundation. It is mostly caused by changes in the underlying soil, such as drying and shrinking, wetting and softening, or compression due to the soil being poorly compacted when construction started. Some settlement is quite normal after construction has been completed.

Unequal settlement or differential settlement is non-uniform settlement. It may cause significant problems for buildings. Distortion or disruption of parts of a building may occur due to

- unequal compression of its foundations;
- shrinkage, such as that which occurs in timber-framed buildings as the frame adjusts its moisture content; or
- undue loads being applied to the building after its initial construction.

Settlement should not be confused with subsidence which results from the load-bearing ground upon which a building sits reducing in level, for instance in areas of mine workings where shafts collapse underground.

Traditional green oak-framed buildings are designed to settle with time as the oak seasons and warps; lime mortar rather than Portland cement is used for its elastic properties and glazing will often employ small leaded lights which can accept movement more readily than larger panes.

== Measurement of settlements ==
The magnitude of settlements can be measured using different techniques such as:

- Surveying
- Settlement cells
- Tiltmeters
- Borehole extensometers
- Full-profile gauge
- Settlement platforms

== See also ==
- Soil consolidation
