= List of shopping malls in Singapore =

This is a list of shopping malls in Singapore, sorted by regions. Some listed shopping malls here are also inclusive as a mixed-use development and or part of a neighbourhood plaza.

== Central ==
- 313@somerset
- Alexandra Retail Centre
- Bugis Junction
- Bugis+
- Capitol Piazza
- Cathay Cineleisure Orchard
- The Centrepoint
- City Square Mall
- CityLink Mall
- Chinatown Point
- Clarke Quay Central
- Duo
- Far East Plaza
- Funan
- Great World
- HDB Hub
- Holland Village Shopping Mall
- ION Orchard
- Jelita Mall
- Junction 8
- Liat Towers
- Lucky Plaza
- Marina Bay Sands
- Marina Bay Link Mall
- Marina Square
- Millenia Walk
- Mustafa Centre
- Ngee Ann City
- Orchard Central
- Orchard Gateway
- Palais Renaissance
- The Paragon
- People's Park Centre
- People's Park Complex
- Plaza Singapura
- Raffles City
- Shaw House and Centre
- Sim Lim Square
- The South Beach
- Square 2
- Suntec City
- Tanjong Pagar Centre
- Tekka Centre
- Tiong Bahru Plaza
- Thomson Plaza
- Novena Square Shopping Mall
- VivoCity
- Landmark Orchard
- Wisma Atria

== East ==
- Bedok Mall
- Century Square
- Changi City Point
- Downtown East
- Eastpoint Mall
- Jewel Changi Airport
- Katong Shopping Centre
- Kallang Wave Mall
- Leisure Park Kallang
- i12 Katong
- Our Tampines Hub
- Parkway Parade
- Paya Lebar Quarter
- Paya Lebar Square
- SingPost Centre
- Tampines 1
- Tampines Mall
- White Sands
- Pasir Ris Mall

== North ==
- AMK Hub
- Canberra Plaza
- Causeway Point
- Northpoint City
- Sembawang Shopping Centre
- Sun Plaza

== North-East ==
- Compass One
- Heartland Mall
- Hougang Mall
- NEX
- Oasis Terraces
- Punggol Plaza
- Punggol Coast Mall
- The Seletar Mall
- Waterway Point
- Northshore Plaza I
- Northshore Plaza II
- Anchorvale Village
- Sengkang Grand Mall
- Hougang Village

== West ==
- Bukit Panjang Plaza
- Dairy Farm Mall
- Fajar Shopping Centre
- Gek Poh Shopping Centre
- Greenridge Shopping Centre
- Hillion Mall
- IMM
- Jem
- Junction 10
- Jurong Point
- HillV2
- Le Quest
- Limbang Shopping Centre
- Lot 1
- Pioneer Mall
- Plantation Plaza
- Parc Point
- Queensway Shopping Centre
- The Clementi Mall
- The Rail Mall
- Teck Whye Shopping Centre
- The Star Vista
- West Coast Plaza
- Westgate
- West Mall
- Yew Tee Point
