= Swissôtel The Stamford =

Hotel skyscraper in Singapore

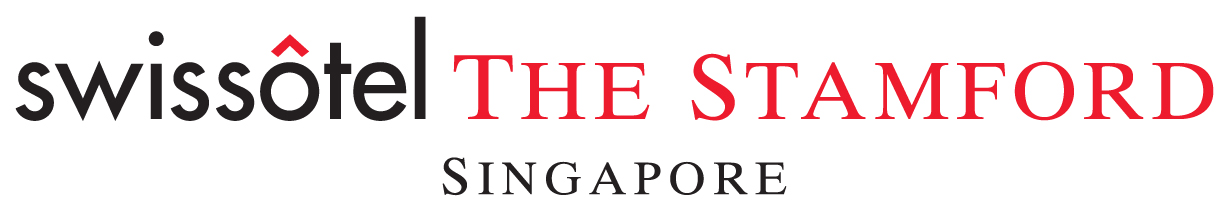

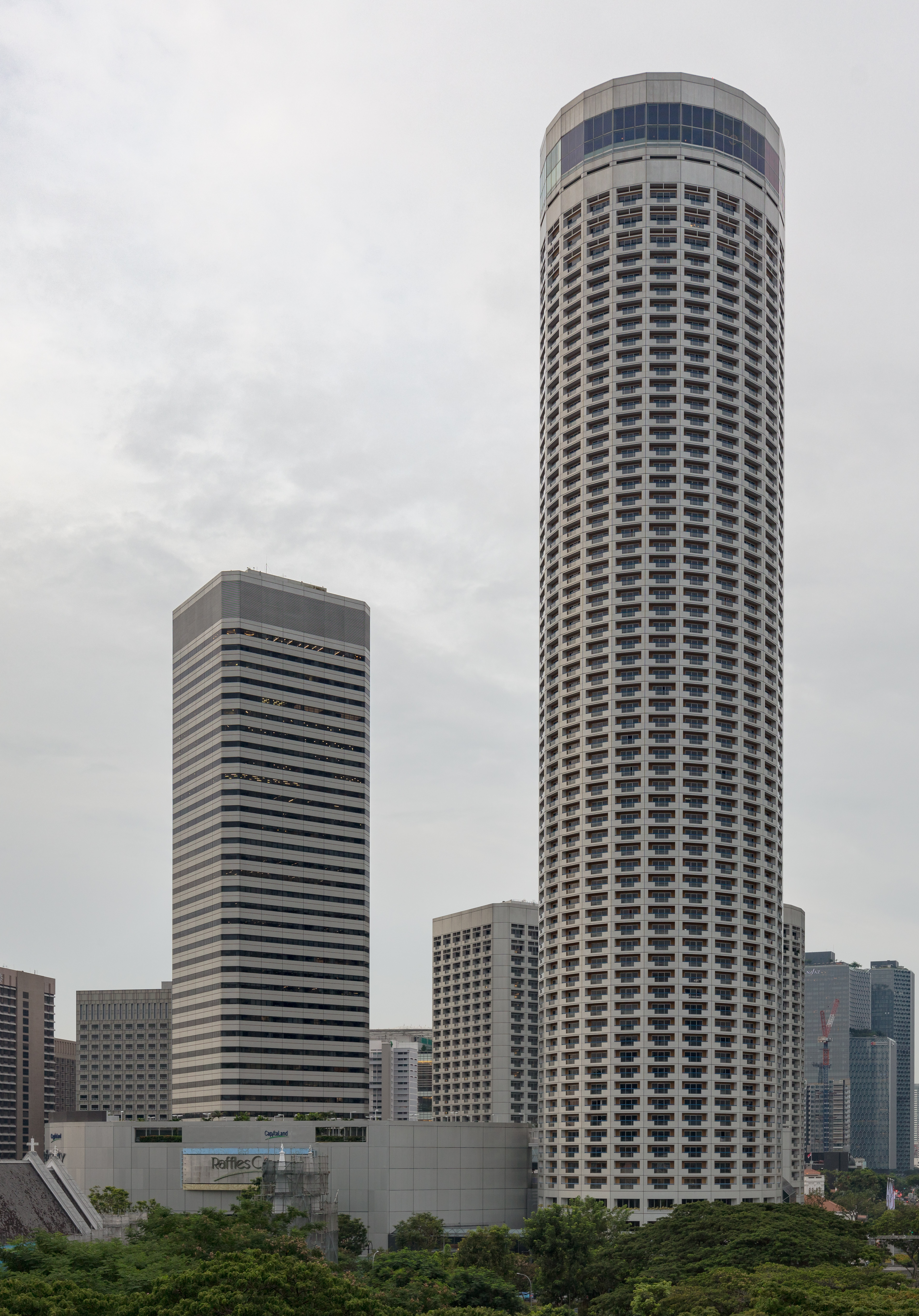
- Swissôtel The Stamford and connected Raffles City complex in 2023

- Location within Singapore
- Hotel chain: Fairmont Raffles Hotels International

General information
- Location: 2 Stamford Road, Singapore 178882
- Coordinates: 1.293544°N 103.85349°E
- Opening: 1986; 40 years ago
- Operator: Swissôtel Hotels & Resorts

Height
- Height: 226 metres (741 ft)

Technical details
- Floor count: 73

Design and construction
- Architect: I.M. Pei

Other information
- Number of rooms: 1,252
- Number of restaurants: 12

Swissôtel The Stamford, formerly known as The Westin Stamford, is a hotel in Singapore managed by Accor. Designed by architect I.M. Pei, at a height of 226 metres (741 ft) it was the tallest hotel in the world when opened in 1986 and remains one of Southeast Asia's tallest hotels. It is part of the Raffles City complex comprising two hotels, the Raffles City Convention Centre, Raffles City shopping centre, and an office tower. Situated at 2 Stamford Road, the hotel sits above City Hall MRT station and Esplanade MRT station.

The 5-star hotel is a sister hotel of Fairmont Singapore and has 1,252 rooms and suites, 12 restaurants and bars, Raffles City Convention Centre, and one of Asia's largest spas, Willow Stream Spa. A major renovation of the hotel was completed in 2019.

== History ==
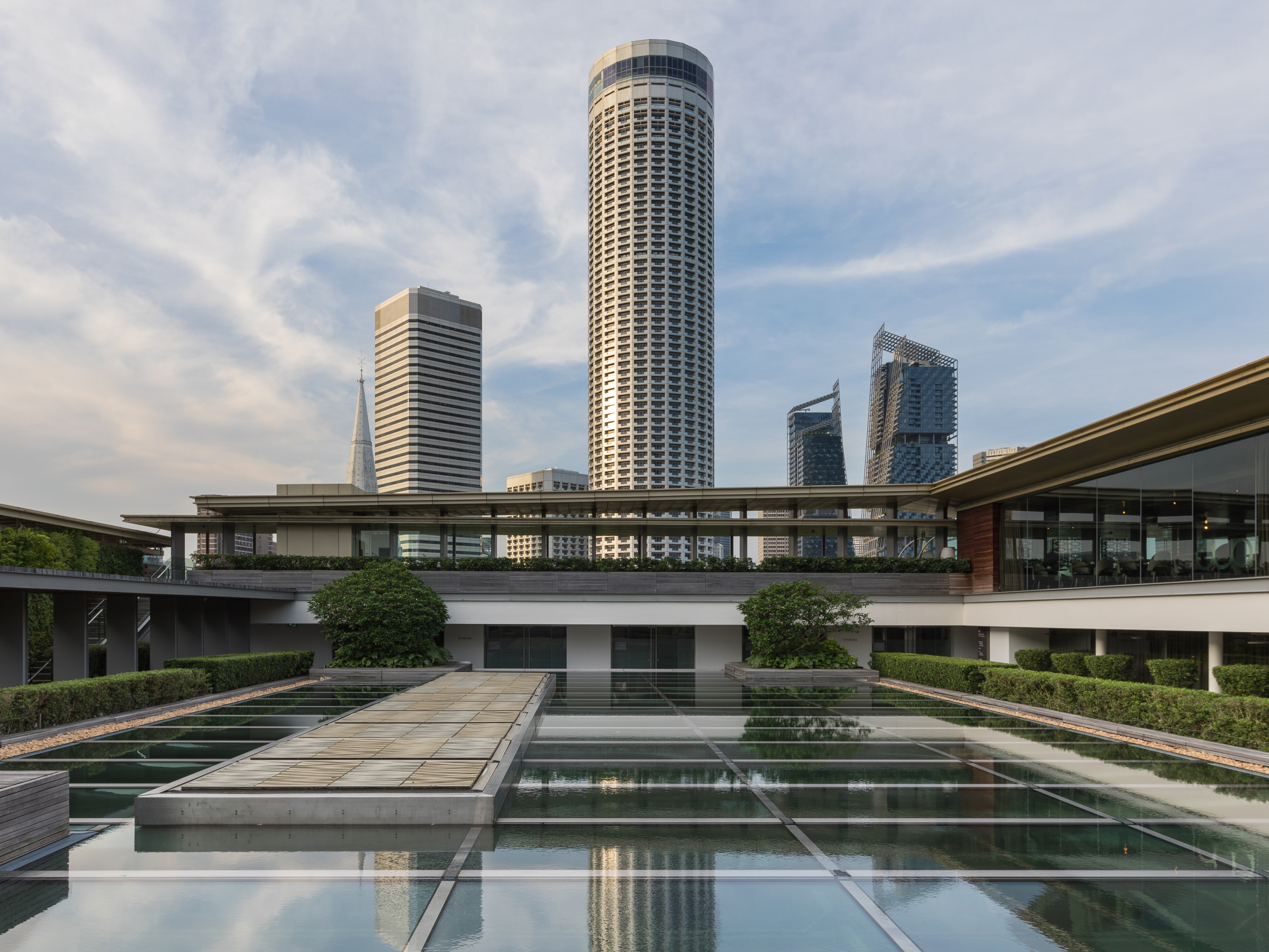
Swissôtel The Stamford seen from the roof of the National Gallery Singapore.

The hotel was designed by architect I. M. Pei as The Westin Stamford, along with its adjacent smaller sister hotel, The Westin Plaza. When completed by the South Korean firm SsangYong Group in 1986, the Westin Stamford was the world's tallest hotel building, rising to a height of 226 metres (741 ft), and held that title until 1997 when the Baiyoke Tower II was completed in Bangkok, Thailand.

On 1 January 2002, at the conclusion of Westin's 15-year management contract with Raffles Holdings, both hotels were renamed. The Westin Stamford became Swissôtel The Stamford and The Westin Plaza became Raffles The Plaza. When Raffles Hotels was acquired by Fairmont in 2006, the smaller Raffles The Plaza hotel was again renamed, becoming the Fairmont Singapore on 12 December 2007.

Swissôtel The Stamford has 12 food and beverage outlets including JAAN by Kirk Westaway (awarded two stars in the Michelin Guide's Singapore edition), recreational facilities, and a 108,000-square-foot (10,000 m^{2}) convention center.

== Raffles City Convention Centre ==
Raffles City Convention Centre (RCCC) spans more than 108,000 square feet (10,000 m^{2}) of flexible function space, including 27 meeting rooms and three ballrooms.

The centre also provides off-site catering. Some major long-term events include the Singapore Air Show (since 2004) and Singapore Grand Prix (since 2007)

== Awards ==
- Time Out Singapore 2010 Best of Awards: New Asia.
- World Gourmet Summit Awards of Excellence 2009 – Rising Chef of the Year: André Chiang of Jaan par André.
- Singapore Tatler Best Restaurant Guide 2009 – Hall of Fame: Jaan par André.
- Michelin Guide Singapore 2016 – one star: Jaan by Kirk Westaway.

== See also ==
- List of tallest buildings in Singapore
