= CityLink Mall =

Underground mall in Singapore

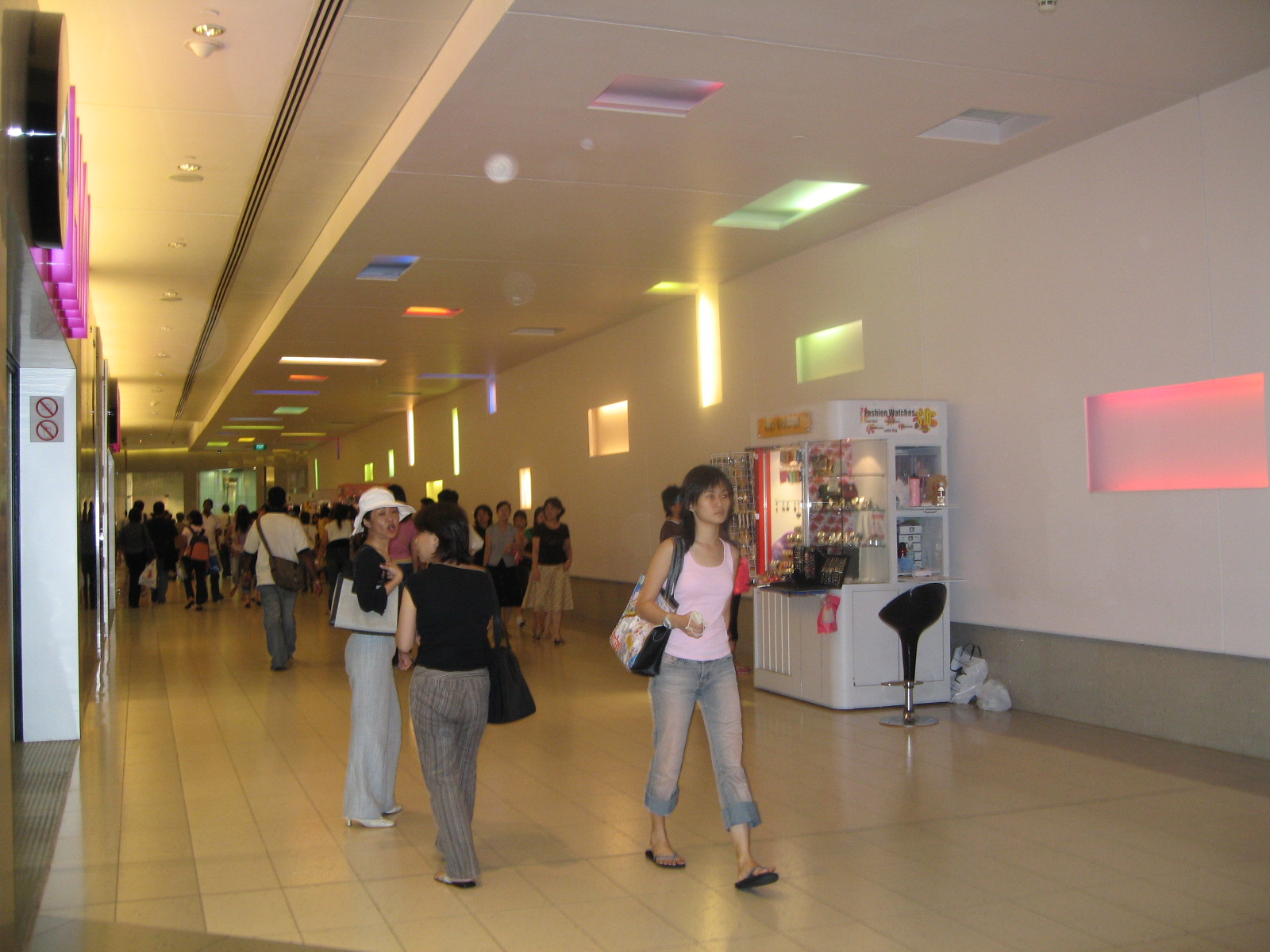
- Location: 1 Raffles Link, Singapore 039393
- Coordinates: 01°17′29″N 103°51′18″E
- Opened: 1 July 2000; 26 years ago
- Developer: Hongkong Land
- Manager: Hongkong Land
- Owner: Hongkong Land
- Floor area: 60,000 sq ft (5,600 m^{2})
- Floors: 7
- Public transit: EW13 NS25 City Hall; CC3 Esplanade
- Website: www.citylink.com.sg

CityLink Mall (simplified Chinese: 城联广场; traditional Chinese: 城聯廣場; pinyin: Chénglián guǎngchǎng) is Singapore's first underground mall, located within the One Raffles Link development at Marina Square. Opened on 1 July 2000, the 60,000 square feet (5,600 m^{2}) underground mall connects City Hall and Esplanade on the Mass Rapid Transit, and to Suntec City Mall, Marina Square, hotels in Marina Centre, Millenia Singapore, Raffles City and to Esplanade – Theatres on the Bay.

Tenants include FunToast, Sushi Express, KOI Café, DMK, Charles & Keith and Pedro.

Former tenants include Rubi Shoes which was closed on 14 August 2012 and New Look which was closed on 29 February 2016 and was replaced by We&Co.
