= Esplanade MRT station =

Mass Rapid Transit station in Singapore

Esplanade CC3 滨海中心 எஸ்பிளனேட்
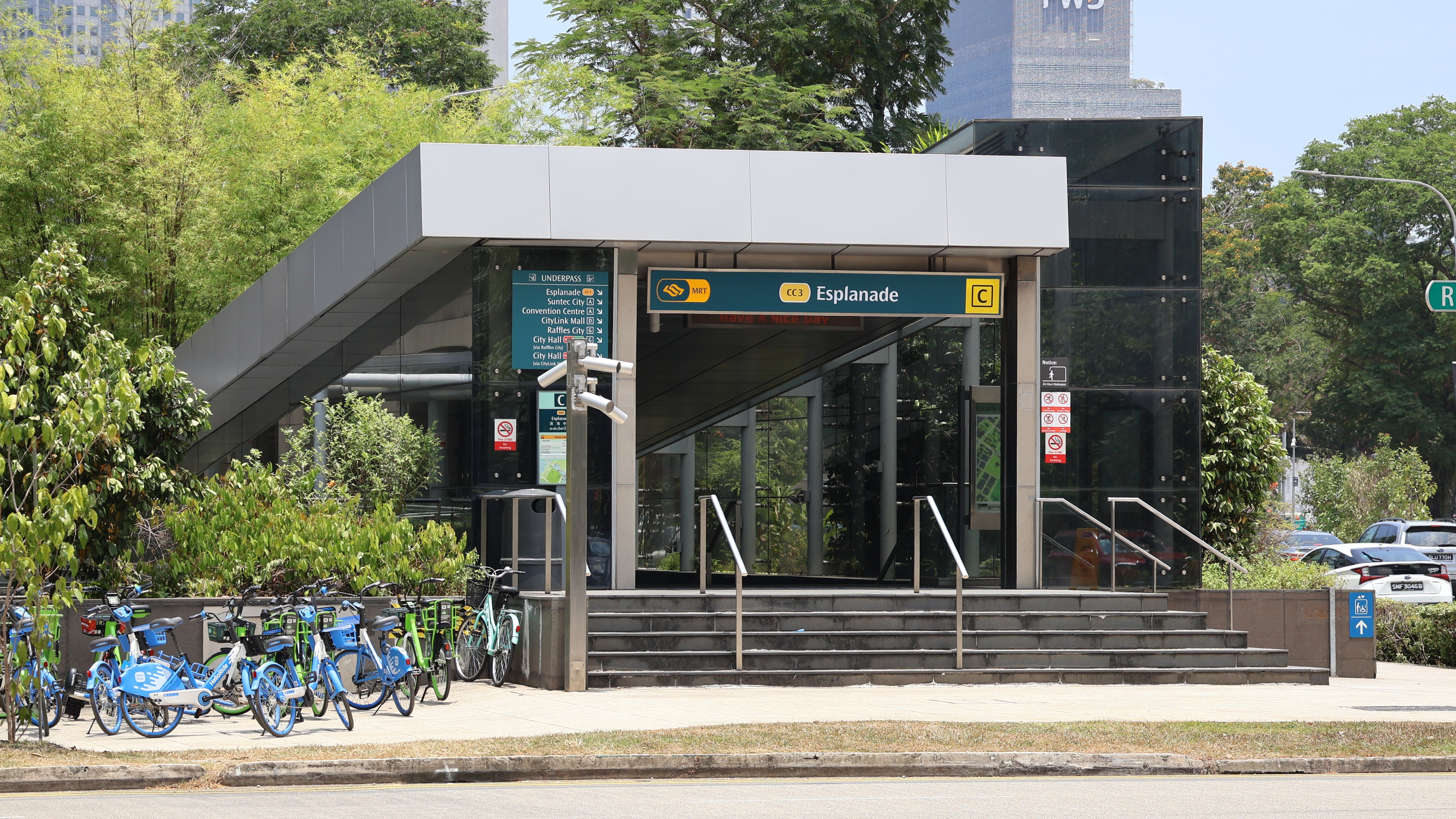
- Exit C of Esplanade station

General information
- Location: 90 Bras Basah Road, Singapore 189562
- Coordinates: 01°17′36″N 103°51′20″E
- System: Mass Rapid Transit (MRT) station
- Owner: Land Transport Authority
- Operator: SMRT Trains
- Line: Circle Line
- Platforms: 2 (1 island platform)
- Tracks: 2
- Connections: NS25 EW13 City Hall (underground walkway); Bus, Taxi

Construction
- Structure type: Underground
- Platform levels: 1
- Parking: Yes (Esplanade, Suntec City)
- Accessible: Yes

Other information
- Station code: EPN

History
- Opened: 17 April 2010; 16 years ago
- Former names: Convention Centre, War Memorial

Passengers
- June 2024: 8,711 per day

Services
Preceding station	Mass Rapid Transit	Following station
Bras Basah towards Dhoby Ghaut	Circle Line	Promenade towards Prince Edward Road
Track layout
Location
- Location within Singapore Rail central area

Esplanade MRT station is an underground Mass Rapid Transit (MRT) station on the Circle Line (CCL) in Singapore. Situated in the Downtown Core, it is at the junction of Bras Basah Road, Raffles Boulevard and Nicoll Highway. As the name suggests, the station serves the Esplanade performing arts centre, alongside various developments such as War Memorial Park, Suntec City Mall and the Suntec Singapore Convention and Exhibition Centre. Esplanade station is linked to the nearby City Hall station via CityLink Mall, an underground retail development.

First announced in 1999 as Convention Centre MRT station as part of the Marina MRT line, it was later incorporated into Stage 1 of the CCL. Several roads were diverted during its construction. The station was renamed Esplanade through a public poll in 2005. Along with the other stations on Stages 1 and 2 of the CCL, the station opened on 17 April 2010. Esplanade station features an Art-in-Transit artwork A Piece of Ice-Clear Heart by Lim Mu Hue.

== History ==
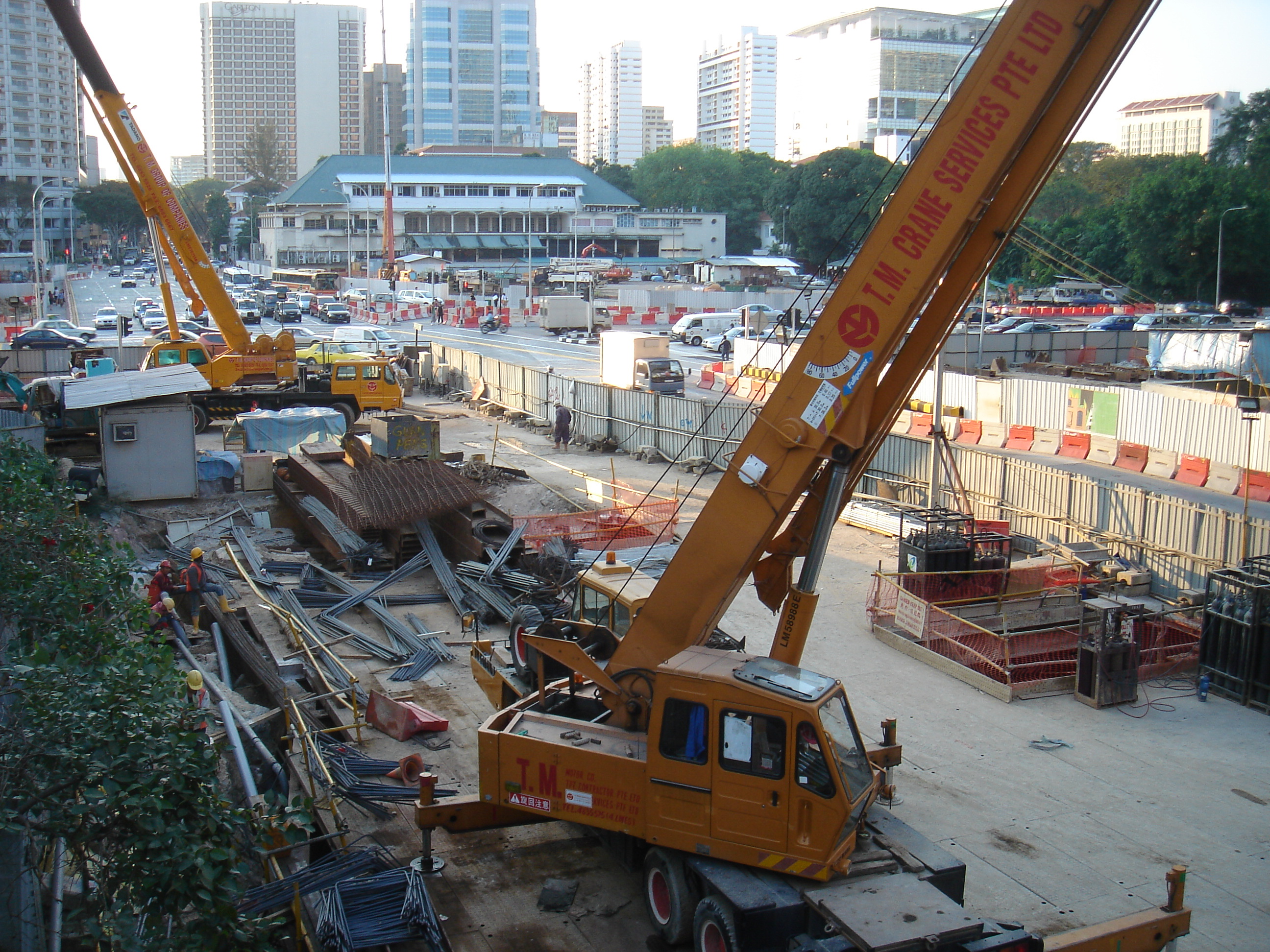
Construction works in March 2006

The station was first announced in November 1999 as Convention Centre station as part of the Marina MRT line (MRL). The MRL consisted of six stations from Dhoby Ghaut to Stadium stations. In 2001, the station became part of Circle Line (CCL) Stage 1 when the MRL was incorporated into the CCL. On 7 August 2001, the Land Transport Authority (LTA) awarded Contract 825 for the design and construction of Convention Centre station and associated tunnels to a joint venture among Shanghai Tunnel Engineering Co. (Singapore) Pte Ltd, Woh Hup Pte Ltd and NCC International AB. The S$343.9 million (US$192 million) contract included the construction of the Dhoby Ghaut, Bras Basah and Promenade stations.

During the station's construction, the arterial routes of Bras Basah Road and Nicoll Highway had to be diverted through more than 10 phases. Road diversions began on 4 August 2002 with the realignment of a stretch of Bras Basah Road and the shifting of Nicoll Highway into War Memorial Park. A pedestrian underpass linking One Raffles Link and Suntec City was closed on 20 January 2003. A sheltered linkway at One Raffles Link and a temporary pedestrian bridge were constructed to facilitate movement between City Hall and Suntec City.

Through a public poll conducted from 26 March to 9 May 2004 to replace its working name "Convention Centre", "Esplanade" garnered more votes at 49% against "War Memorial" at 41%. This was the first time the LTA consulted the public regarding the station names. The name was finalised on 7 July 2005.

To minimise the impact of noise and dust pollution on the surrounding developments, the station was constructed using the top-down method. Diaphragm walls were built to minimise ground movement. With the roof constructed first, construction could proceed under all weather conditions while allowing the early reinstatement of Bras Basah Road and War Memorial Park. At the end of 2007, the diverted roads' original alignments were reinstated.

On 30 April 2008, the underpass reopened to the public. The reopening was marked with a celebration as Suntec City Mall offered goodies and organised music and line dancing performances. The station opened on 17 April 2010 along with the stations on CCL Stages 1 and 2. Prior to its opening, passengers were offered a preview of the station during the CCL Discovery open house on 4 April 2010.

== Station details ==
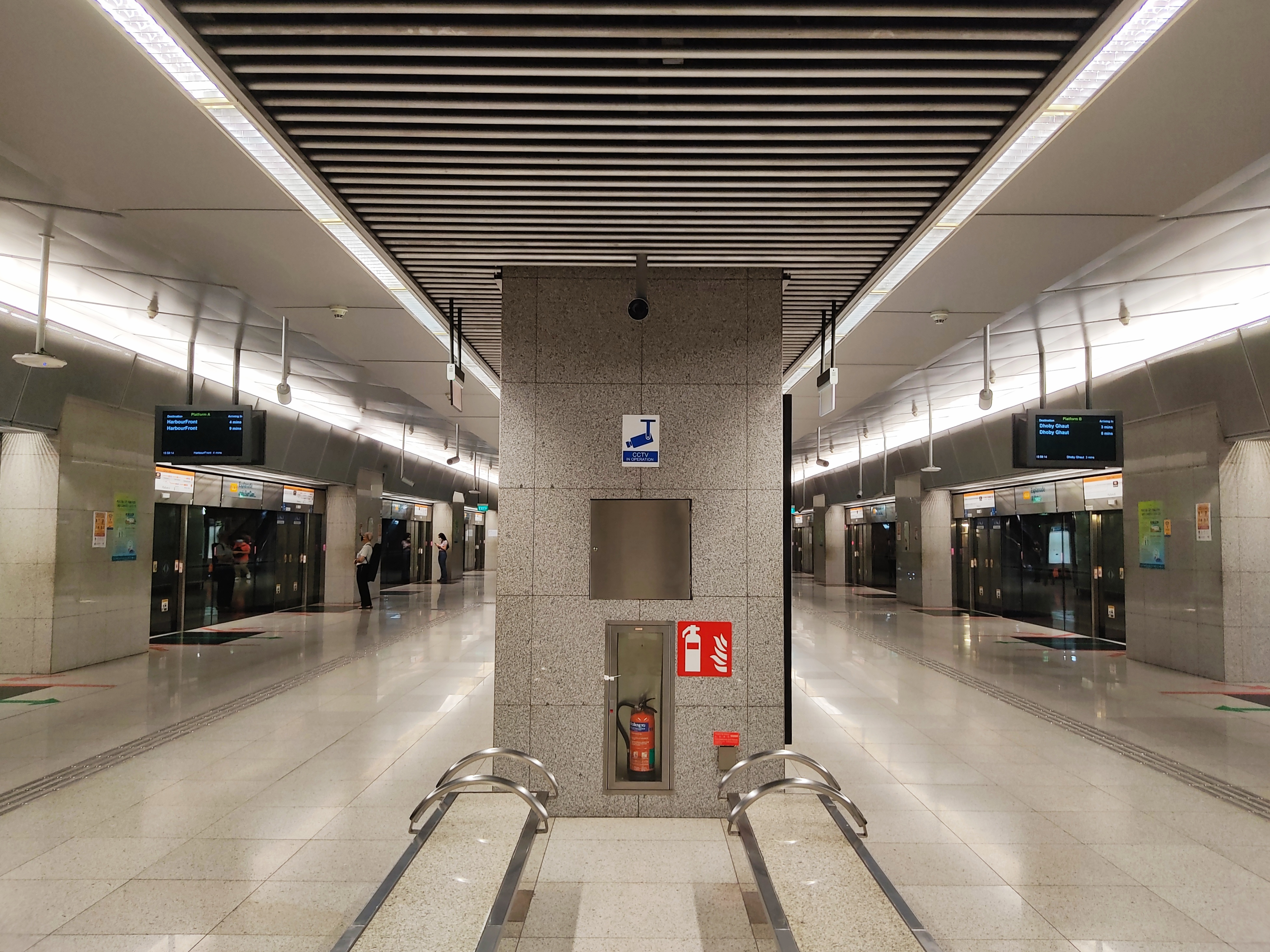
Platform level of the station

Esplanade station serves the Circle Line and is between the Bras Basah and Promenade stations. The official station code is CC3. Esplanade station is within walking distance of City Hall MRT station on the North–South and East–West lines, linked to the station via CityLink Mall. The station has provisions to allow it to interchange with a future MRT line provisionally known as the Art Centre Line.

As the name suggests, the station is located near Esplanade Theatres. In addition to the Esplanade, the three-level station is connected to the various developments surrounding the junction of Bras Basah Road, Raffles Boulevard and Nicoll Highway. Surrounding cultural landmarks include War Memorial Park, Raffles Hotel and the Padang, while the station serves retail and commercial buildings such as Marina Square, Raffles City Singapore, Suntec Convention Centre, Suntec City Mall and South Beach Tower.

The station is wheelchair accessible. A tactile system, consisting of tiles with rounded or elongated raised studs, guides visually impaired commuters through the station, with dedicated tactile routes that connect the station entrances to the platforms. Wider fare gates allow easier access for wheelchair users into the station. The station has retail shops part of Esplanade Xchange operated by SMRT retail arm Stellar Lifestyle. The retail space also includes Hive 2.0, a high-tech retail innovation hub, which includes start-ups specialising in automation, robotics and digital retail services.

=== Public artwork ===
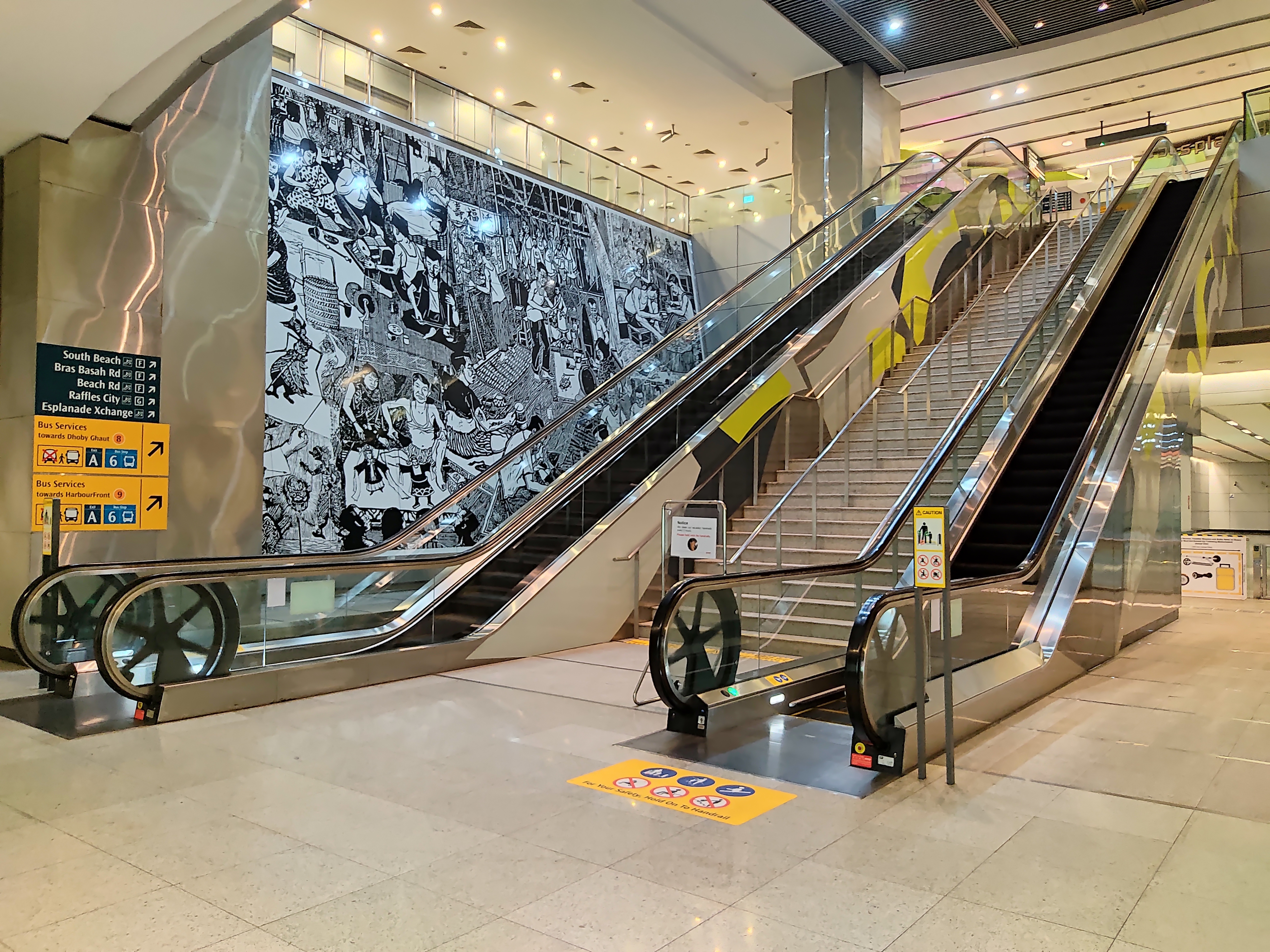
The artwork featured at the concourse level of the station

Commissioned as part of the Art-in-Transit programme, a showcase that integrates public artwork in the MRT network, A Piece of Ice-Clear Heart by Lim Mu Hue is displayed at the station. The 8.6-by-15.1-metre (28 by 50 ft) mural consists of seven pieces of woodblock prints featuring scenes of shadow puppetry and other performances that were popular during the early days of Singapore. Depicting the origins of theatre, the work is inspired by, and pays homage to, the nearby Esplanade Theatres. This was Lim's last and largest commission before his death in 2008.

The artwork is a collage of Lim's early works, including Backstage Heroes, Puppet Masters and Teochew Opera Singing. Finding his works on theatre to be relevant for the station, curator Karen Lim and the Art Review Panel commissioned him for this station, unaware that he had been diagnosed with cancer. Karen Lim at the time hoped to bring more awareness to woodblock printing, as it was getting rarer in Singapore with fewer artists utilising it.

To reflect the multicultural influences on Singapore's performing arts, Lim produced another work, Wayang Kulit, alongside Puppet Masters at Work. The latter work was created to illustrate the link between theatre and wood art. Initially, Lim came up with only a few prints and sketches depicting the process of creating a woodblock print. Upon Karen's suggestion to produce more of his actual prints, Lim went on to experiment with fusing his works technologically, revisiting and editing his old works to create a cohesive mural.

Due to limited time and his ailing health, his two latest works were digitally edited from the original carvings. Meanwhile, Lim travelled to China (accompanied by his two daughters) to observe puppet masters in action to accurately depict them in his work. Lim went on to finish his work, going through numerous revisions and refining certain details before dying. His children continued to work with the LTA and the production team to put up the work. Resizing to a higher resolution from the original smaller prints, the work had to be digitally altered for it to fit on the slanted wall so that it did not look distorted when viewed from the ground.
