= Rendezvous Hotel Singapore =

Hotel in Singapore

Rendezvous Hotel
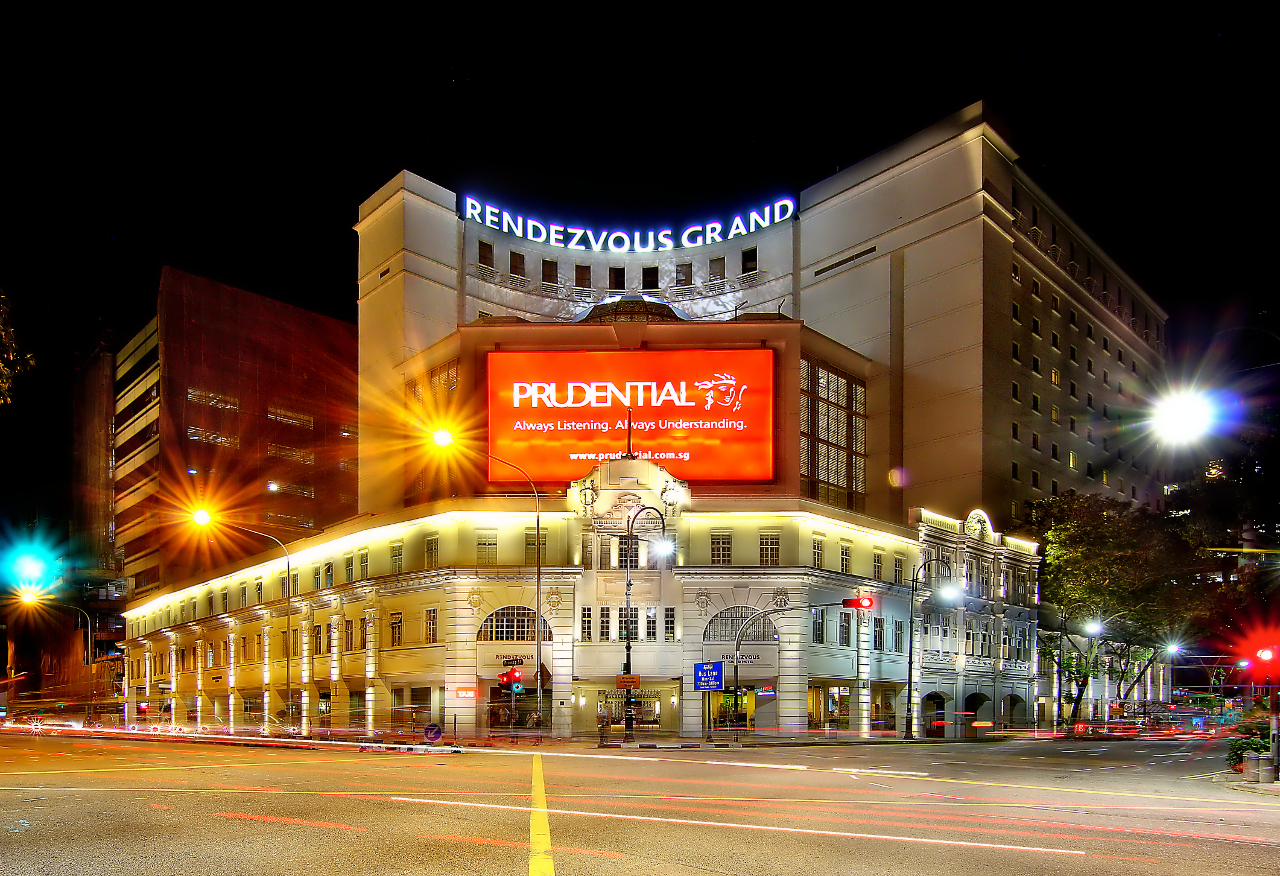
- The Rendezvous Hotel Singapore when it was known as the Rendezvous Grand Hotel Singapore

- Location within Singapore

General information
- Location: 9 Bras Basah Rd, Singapore 189559
- Coordinates: 1°17′58.06″N 103°50′59.89″E

Website
- Official website

The Rendezvous Hotel Singapore (formerly the Rendezvous Grand Hotel Singapore) is a hotel located on Bras Basah Road in the Museum District of Singapore, across from the Singapore Management University (SMU). It is located on the historic site of the Hock Lock Kee Restaurant which began operations in the early 1950s. Later called the Rendezvous Restaurant, it remained in the hotel complex for a number of years before moving to The Central.

Rendezvous Hotel Singapore is part of a chain of Rendezvous Hotels owned by The Straits Trading Company Ltd. In 2013, Far East Hospitality Holdings Pte. Ltd., a premier hospitality assets owner and operator, acquired the Rendezvous Grand Hotel Singapore and the adjoining Rendezvous Gallery for S$270.1 million. It formed a 70%–30% joint venture between Far East Orchard Limited (a listed company under Far East Organization) and The Straits Trading Company.

On 17 January 2014, the Rendezvous brand was re-branded with an art-inspired character. Refurbished common areas embody the art theme. The Club Rooms reflect three artsy styles, Performing Arts, Retro or Peranakan, and Club Rendezvous (a club lounge) offers a scenic view of the city.

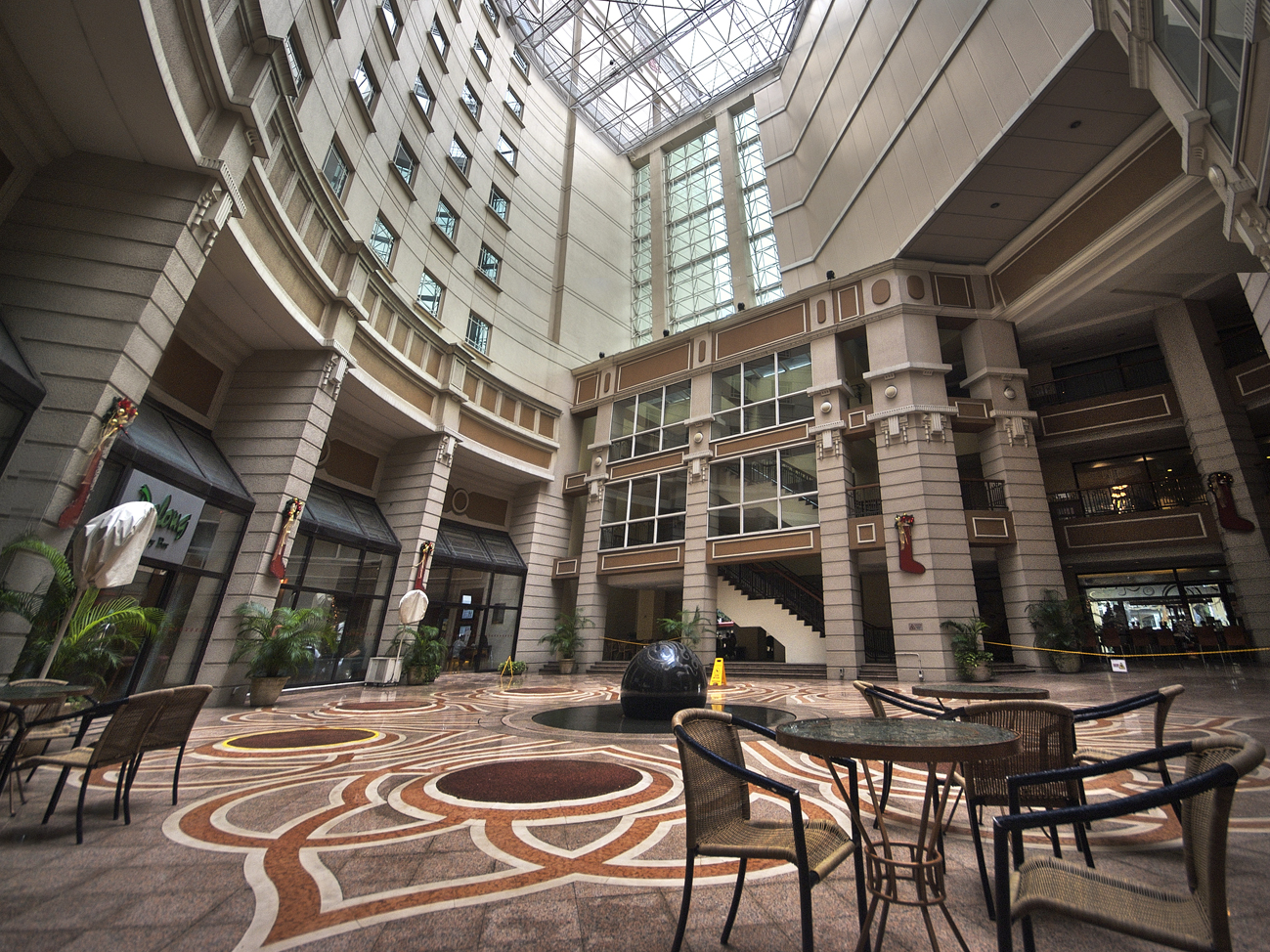
The courtyard of the Rendezvous Hotel Singapore, before it was renovated and renamed the Rendezvous Grand Hotel Singapore
