= Civic District =

District located in Singapore

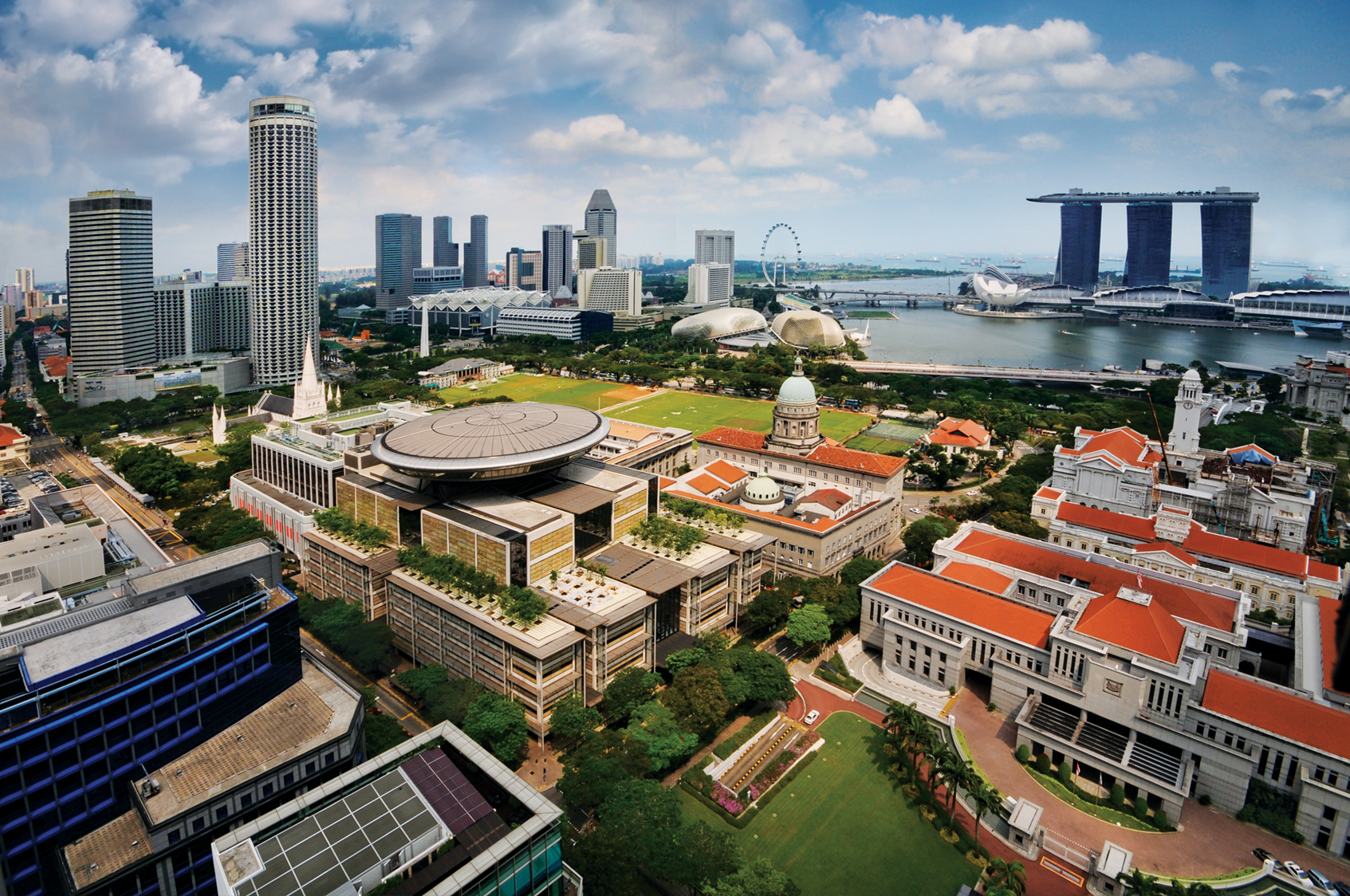
An aerial view of the Civic District of Singapore

The Civic District is a district located near the Singapore River in the Central Area of Singapore.

It contains historical buildings and museums such as The Arts House (the former Parliament House), National Gallery Singapore (consisting of the Former Supreme Court Building and Former City Hall), National Museum of Singapore (the former Raffles Library and Museum), and Asian Civilisations Museum (the former Empress Place Building). It also includes the memorial such as the Civilian War Memorial, Lim Bo Seng Memorial and The Cenotaph. Other institutions within the district includes Parliament House, Esplanade, Fort Canning, Supreme Court Building, Raffles City, and the City Hall MRT station.
