= Jelita Mall =

Shopping mall in Bukit Timah, Singapore

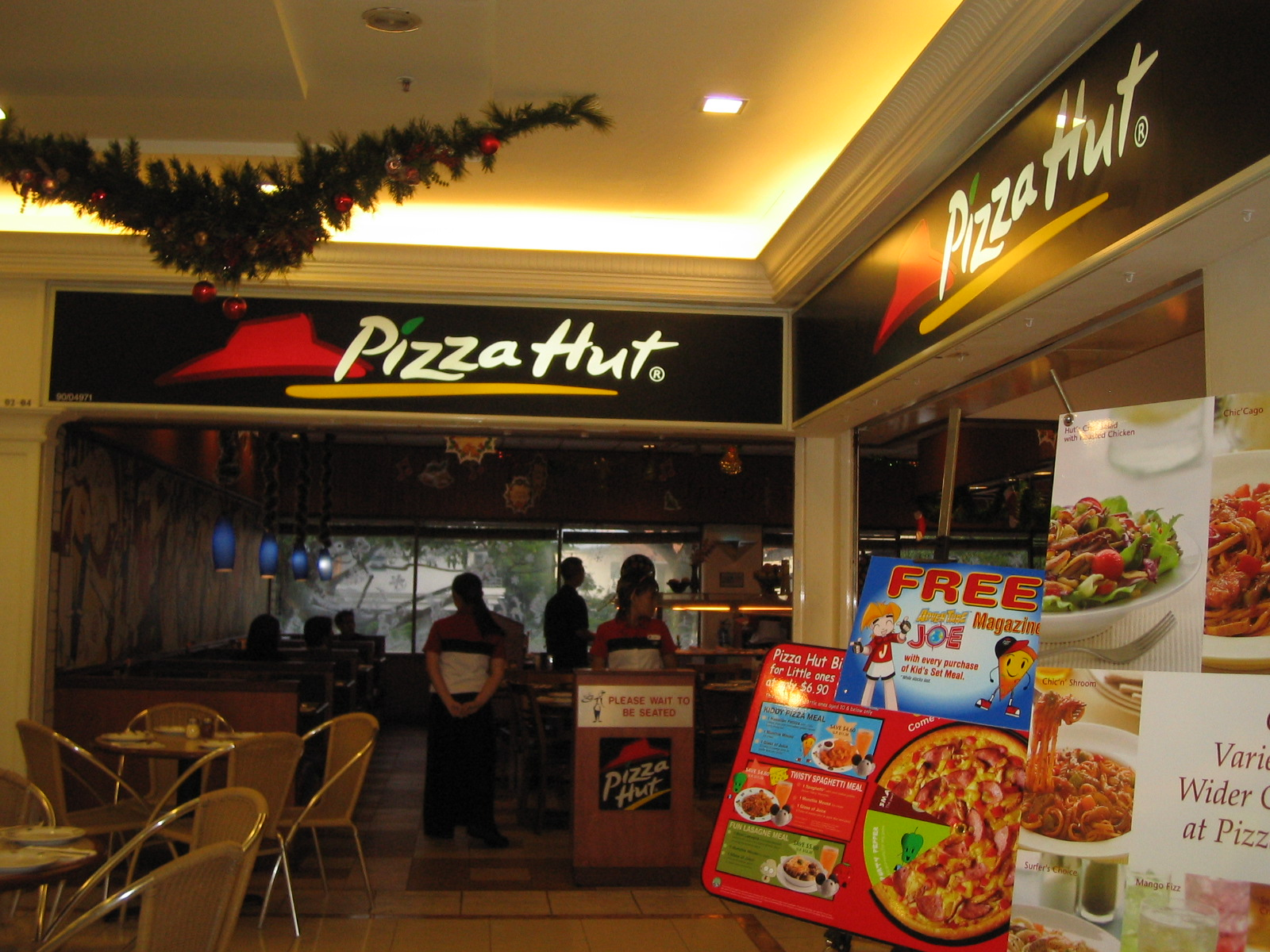
- The mall's former Pizza Hut outlet in 2005.
- Location: Bukit Timah
- Coordinates: 1.31758°N 103.7859°E
- Address: 293 Holland Road, Singapore 278628
- Opened: 1981
- Previous names: Jelita Shopping Centre
- Developer: Cold Storage
- Manager: Peter Koh Pang An and his wife
- Architect: Singapore Associate Architects
- Num. of anchor tenants: Cold Storage
- Floor area: 4,388 square metres (5,248 sq yd)
- Floors: 2
- Parking: Yes
- Website: jelitamall.sg

Jelita Mall is a shopping centre at the corner of Holland Road and Jalan Jelita in Bukit Timah, Singapore. The two-storey building opened in 1981 as the Jelita Shopping Centre, with the anchor tenant Cold Storage occupying the entire ground floor. Other noteworthy tenants included a Times Bookstores outlet which eventually became the chain's last in the country before its 2024 closure. The mall was sold in 2023 and underwent months of renovations before reopening in 2025 as the Jelita Mall.

== History ==
The shopping centre was built by Cold Storage, who planned to gradually transfer its Holland Village outlet to the building. The project costed $6 million and was intended to serve residents of the Holland Road and Ulu Pandan areas, as well as housing estates in the neighbourhoods of Clementi and Dover. The two-storey structure with an area of approximately 4,388 sq metres was designed by the firm Singapore Associate Architects, and the main construction work was carried out by Lee Kim Tah Holdings. The shopping centre opened at the start of 1981. At its opening, the Cold Storage outlet took up the entire ground floor of the building. Other tenants then included outlets of Pizza Hut and the APM Holdings emporium, including a dry cleaner, a florist, salons, tailors, arts and crafts shops and furniture stores. It had a car park in the basement with a capacity of 63 cars. By June, sales at the mall had "exceeded" expectations and it had "maintained" its "nice start".

According to Khoo Yong Hao of TheSmartLocal, the mall was patronised by "affluent" expatriates living in the Holland Village neighbourhood who would do their grocery shopping at the Cold Storage. The shopping centre underwent renovations and an expansion in 1990, reopening in April with outlets for two of Cold Storage's subsidiaries, Monique's Cafe of Sunshine Bakeries and 7-Eleven Singapore, which Cold Storage acquired the previous year. In April 2001, an investigation from the Consumers Association of Singapore found that the centre's Cold Storage was one of the three best supermarkets in the country, along with the Shop N Save on Stadium Way and the NTUC FairPrice at Marina Square. The centre's Times Bookstore outlet became the company's last in Singapore in 2021 following the closure of its outlets at Marina Square and Paragon. The outlet shut down on 22 September 2024.

In June 2023, DFI Retail Group put the mall on the market with a guide price of $85 million. The company was "looking to divest and enter into a long-term leaseback arrangement with the prospective buyer of Jelita Shopping Centre." There were also plans to renovate and reopen the Cold Storage outlet as a CS Fresh outlet. It was sold to property investor Peter Koh Pang An and his wife in November for $91.68 million. The couple announced that they planned to upgrade the mall alongside the Cold Storage. The shopping centre reopened as the Jelita Mall in May 2025 after several months of renovations. The facelift saw the introduction of a food court.
