= Raffles City Singapore =

Coordinates: 1°17′37″N 103°51′11″E

Raffles City
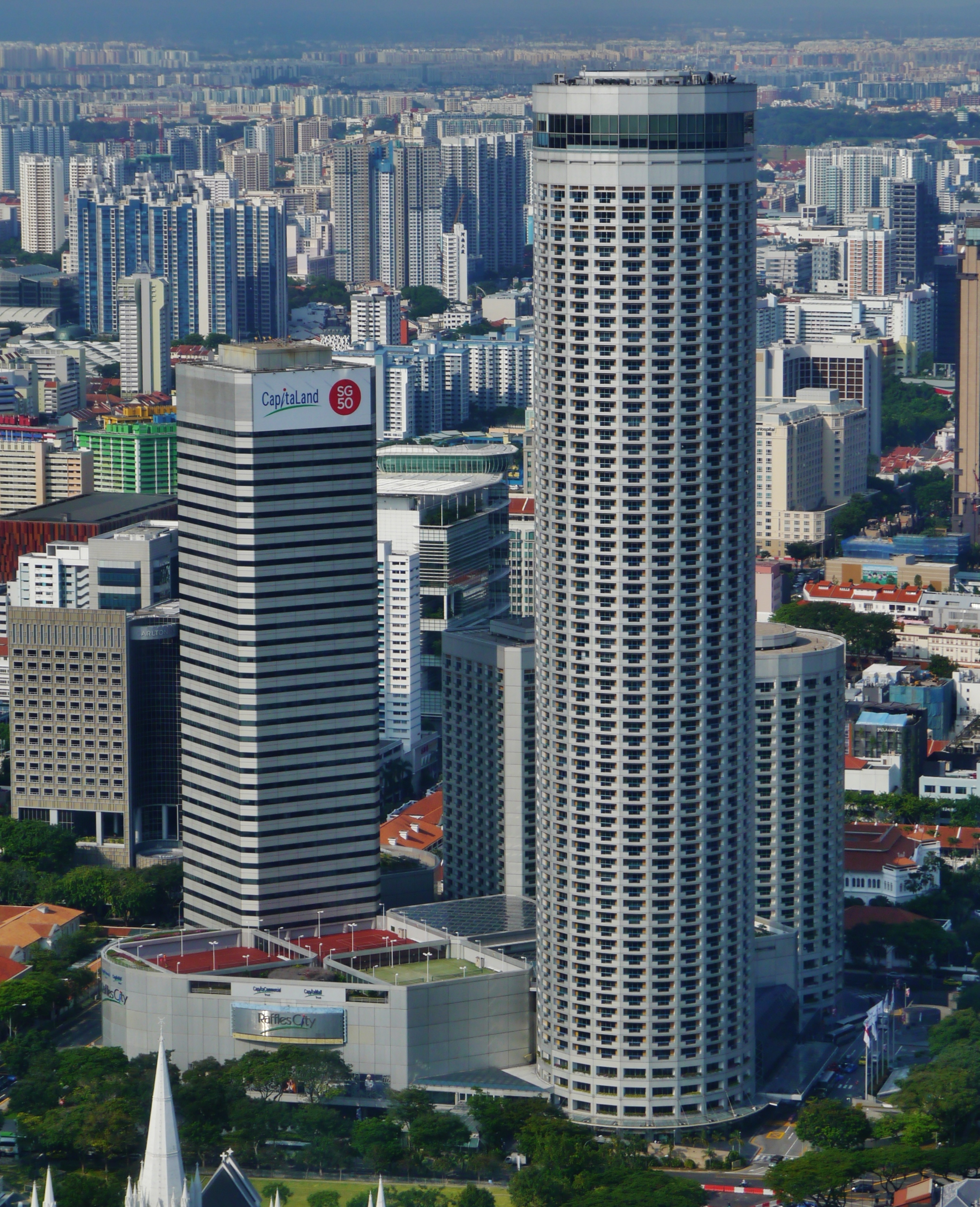
- Interactive map of the Raffles City area
- Alternative names: Raffles International Centre (initial name)

General information
- Status: Occupied
- Type: Office hotel shopping complex
- Architectural style: High-rise
- Location: City Hall, Downtown Core, Singapore
- Owner: CapitaCommercial Trust; CapitaMall Trust
- Operator: CapitaLand

Height
- Roof: 158 metres (518 ft) (office)

Technical details
- Floor count: 7 (retail); 42 (office)
- Floor area: 421,720 square feet (39,179 m^{2}) (retail); 380,900 square feet (35,390 m^{2}) (office)

Design and construction
- Architects: I. M. Pei; Architects 61
- Developer: Tincel Properties
- Main contractor: SsangYong Group

Other information
- Public transit: NS25 EW13 City Hall CC3 Esplanade

Website
- Raffles City

Raffles City is a large complex located in the Civic District within the Downtown Core of the city-state of Singapore. Occupying an entire city block bounded by Stamford Road, Beach Road, Bras Basah Road and North Bridge Road, it houses two hotels and an office tower over a podium which contains a shopping complex and a convention centre. The mall is managed by CapitaLand Integrated Commercial Trust. It was completed in 1986.

Built on the former site of Raffles Institution, the first school in Singapore, and located beside the historic Raffles Hotel, its aluminium-finish and simple geometric designs gave a stark, modernist contrast to Victorian architecture and classical architecture which used to characterise architecture in that district.

== History ==
=== Initial plans ===
The development, initially called the Raffles International Centre, was announced in 1969. It was planned to cover an area stretching from the then-site of Raffles Institution up to the Cathay Building. Due to soaring costs and a shortage of skilled workers, the plans were put on hold from 1973 to 1975 and approval for construction was not given until 1979. That same year, the development was renamed Raffles City, and the site was shrunken to only the old Raffles Institution location.

=== Construction ===
Groundbreaking on the site took place on 14 August 1980 and it officially opened to the public on 3 October 1986. The complex was designed by I. M. Pei in one of his earliest works in the city state. The complex contained The Westin Stamford Hotel, then the tallest in the world; The Westin Plaza, its smaller sister hotel; an office tower; a convention center and a shopping mall.

=== Renovations ===
In the 1990s the shopping complex went under a major renovation, with a different look. In June 2005, the management announced that the basement section of the complex will be expanded, with 30 to 50 more shops and was completed in July 2006 with MPH Bookstores, food and beverage outlets and fashion shops occupying the extension. Gloria Jean's Coffees has also made a return to the country after exiting the country a few years ago. The complex is directly connected to City Hall MRT (Exit 'A") station by escalators from the building entrance and to Esplanade MRT station (Exit 'G') from Basement 2, which leads to the Esplanade Xchange and then to Marina Square.

=== Hotel rebranding ===
At the conclusion of Westin's 15-year management contract with Raffles Holdings, the hotels were both renamed on 1 January 2002, with The Westin Stamford becoming Swissôtel The Stamford and The Westin Plaza becoming Raffles The Plaza. When Raffles Hotels was acquired by Fairmont in 2006, Raffles The Plaza was again renamed, becoming the Fairmont Singapore on 12 December 2007.

=== CapitaLand REITs takeover ===
On 19 March 2006, CapitaLand's real estate investment trust (REIT), CapitaCommercial Trust and CapitaMall Trust jointly acquired the development from Raffles Holdings for S$2.09 billion. The former will take up a 60 percent stake in the complex and the latter taking the remainder 40 percent. The trusts' shareholders approved of the purchase of the complex in July 2006. The deal has been completed in August 2006 and the complex is owned by the two trusts.

=== Expansion ===
On 20 August 2006, the new owners announced their plans to expand the retail space between 150,000 and 200,000 sq ft (19,000 m^{2}) from its current 356,000 sq ft (33,100 m^{2}), by using the space on the carpark floors on basements two and three. The two CapitaLand property trusts will spend S$86 million on the expansion. An underground link linking Esplanade and City Hall MRT stations opened on 15 July 2010.

=== Reconfiguration works ===
On 20 December 2021, CapitaLand announced the reconfiguration of 111,000 sq ft (10,300 m^{2}) located on levels 1 to 3 to attract more specialty shops with new escalators installed to increase accessibility for shoppers, replacing the space at the time occupied by department store One Assembly and previously Robinsons & Co., which would shut on 3 January 2022. The reconfiguration featured new shop concepts and brands as part of an asset enhancement initiative, which would be completed by the fourth quarter of 2022.

== Buildings ==
The complex consists of the one-time world's tallest hotel and currently the world's fourteenth tallest hotel, the 73-storey Swissôtel The Stamford, a 28-storey high-end twin-tower hotel, the Fairmont Singapore and the rectangular 42-storey Raffles City Tower, an office block.

== Tenants ==
Japanese departmental store Sogo opened in 1986 but vacated the space in October 2000 after the company ran into financial problems due to the 1997 Asian financial crisis.

Marks & Spencer has opened since 2001 alongside local favorite Robinsons and Dairy Farm's premium supermarket brand Market Place by Jasons. Both department stores were closed down due to COVID-19 pandemic (Robinsons on 9 January 2021 with Marks & Spencer supposed to close on 31 December 2020, which did not shut eventually)) and replaced with One Assembly, a joint-venture between Raffles City and BHG department store. One Assembly will subsequently shut as well on 3 January 2022. Marks & Spencer eventually announced its closure again, before reopening in June 2022.

Also, Melissa has opened in 2017 but it was closed down in 2021 citing financial losses over COVID-19 pandemic and rationalisation of business, with Cotton On Body took over from 2021 to 2024. Cotton On Body closed down the store on 19 May 2024 and was replaced by M&G Life, again citing lower demand and alternatives to it (Plaza Singapura and ION Orchard), with public transport alternatives to be able to shop for this store.

The embassy of Hungary is located on the 29th floor of the Raffles City Tower, which also houses the delegation office of the European Union.

== Events ==
=== 117 IOC Session, Singapore ===
The 117th IOC Session in Singapore, was held from 2 to 9 July 2005 at the Raffles City Convention Centre on the fourth floor. Security at the complex was extremely tight during the event. At the IOC Session, London was awarded the 2012 Summer Olympics.

== Gallery ==
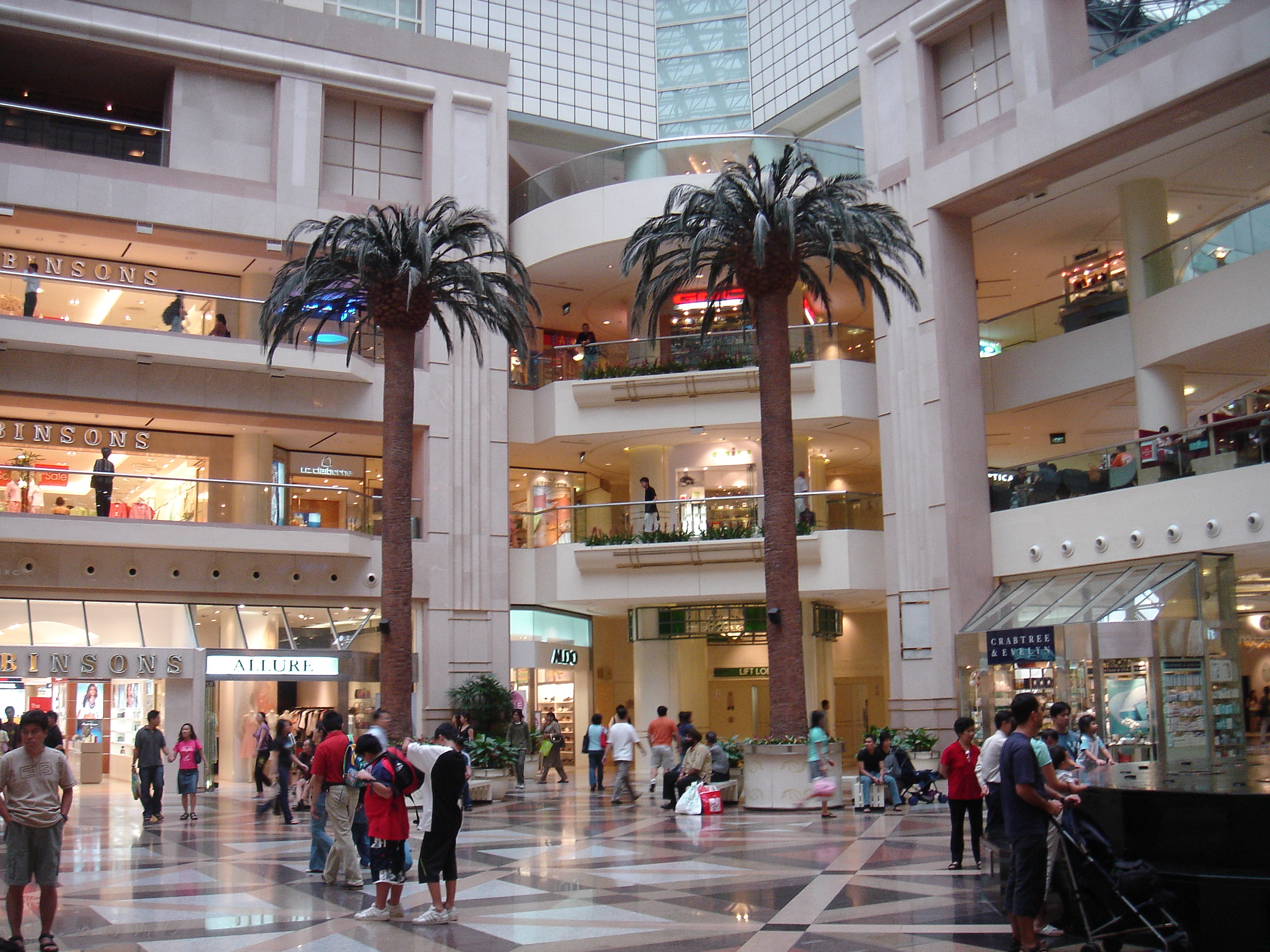
Interior view

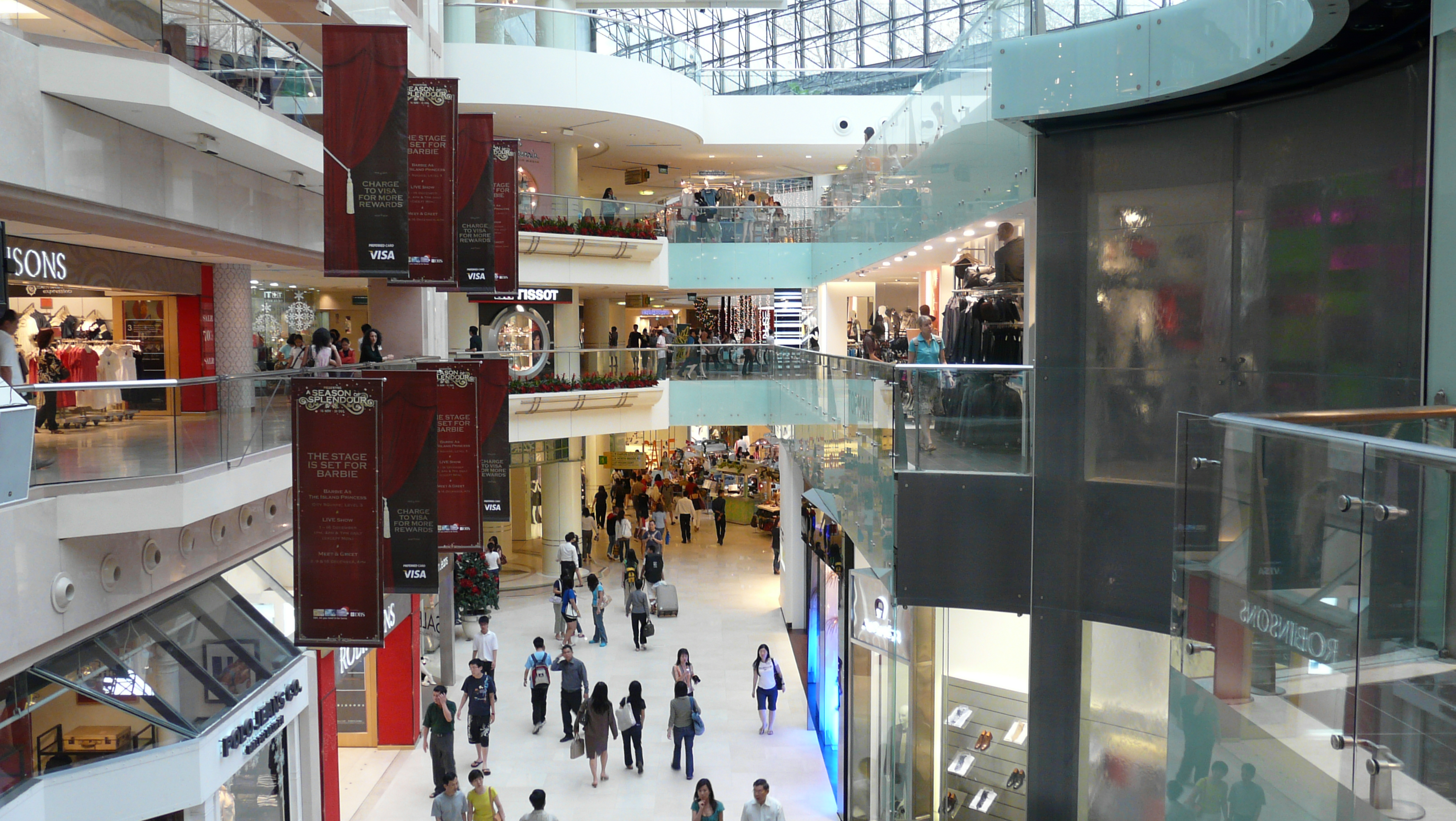
The refurbished end

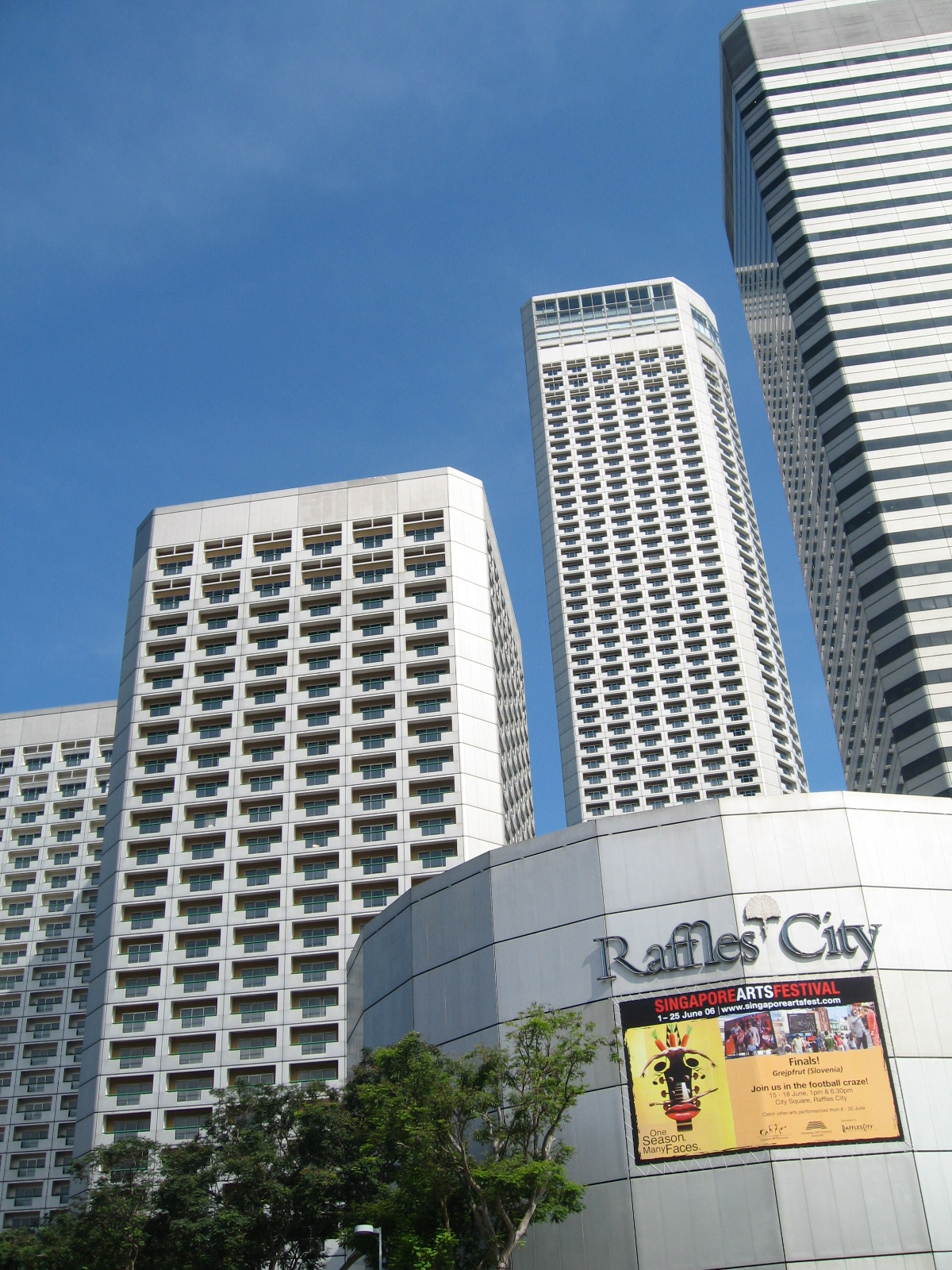
Another view of the complex

== See also ==
- List of shopping malls in Singapore
- List of tallest buildings in Singapore
