= Fairmont Singapore =

Hotel skyscrapers in Singapore

Fairmont Singapore 费尔蒙特酒店
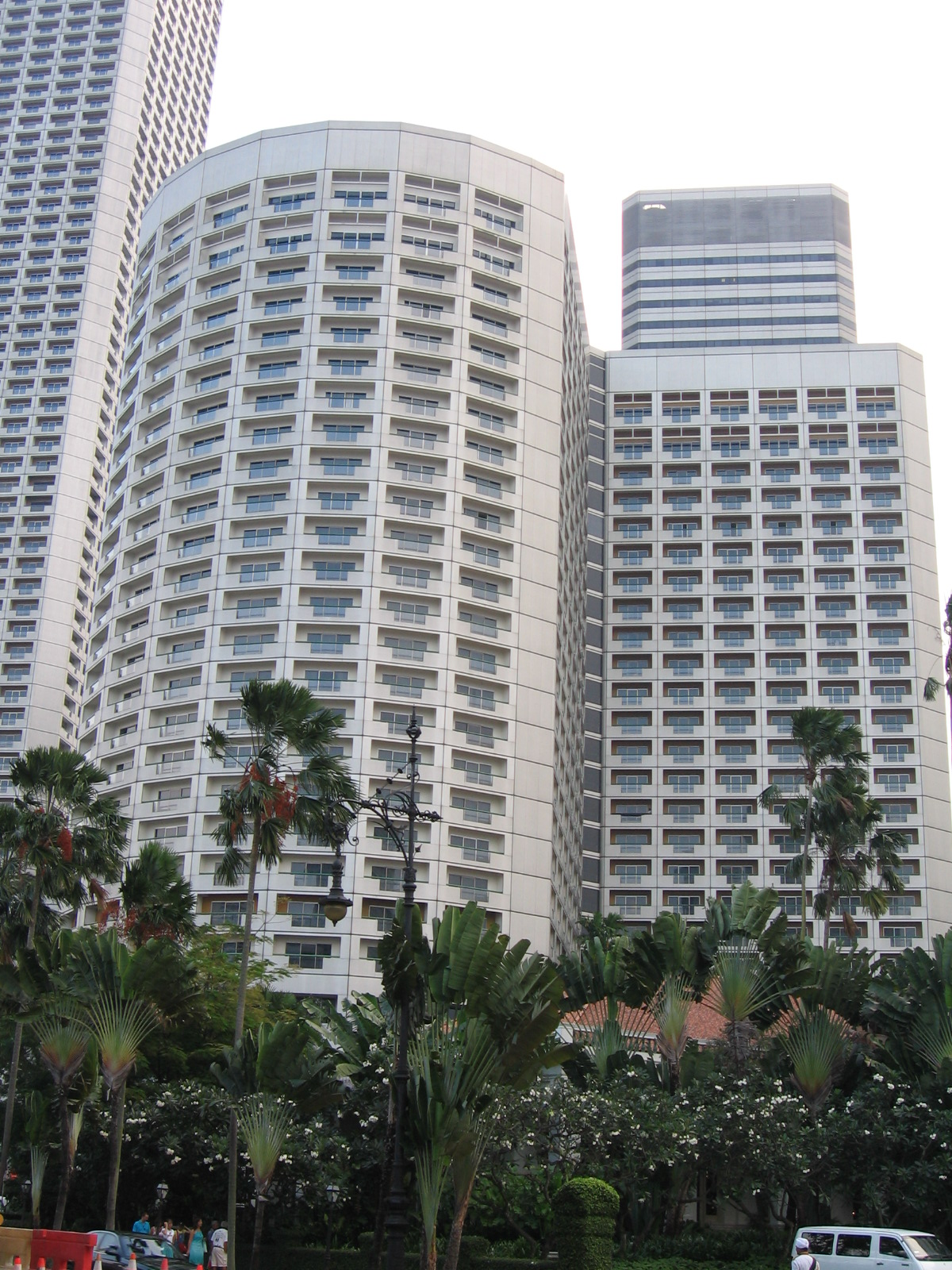
- Interactive map of the Fairmont Singapore 费尔蒙特酒店 area
- Former names: Raffles The Plaza (莱佛士大厦)
- Alternative names: The Westin Plaza

General information
- Status: Completed
- Type: Hotel
- Architectural style: High-rise
- Location: 80 Bras Basah Road, Singapore 189560
- Coordinates: 1°17′39.0″N 103°51′12.9″E
- Construction started: 1980; 46 years ago
- Completed: 1985; 41 years ago
- Opening: 1986; 40 years ago
- Owner: CapitaCommercial Trust and CapitaMall Trust
- Operator: Accor

Technical details
- Floor count: 26
- Lifts/elevators: 10

Design and construction
- Architects: I. M. Pei with Architects 61
- Developer: Tincel Properties
- Main contractor: SsangYong Group

Other information
- Number of rooms: 778
- Number of restaurants: 6

Website
- fairmont.com/singapore

Fairmont Singapore (Chinese: 费尔蒙特酒店) is the sister hotel located within the Raffles City complex in Singapore. It has a total of 778 rooms and suites housed within two 26-storey towers.

== History ==
The Westin Plaza opened in October 1986, as part of the Raffles City complex, which also included a shopping mall, a convention center, an office tower, and an adjoining sister hotel, The Westin Stamford. At the conclusion of Westin's 15-year management contract with Raffles Holdings, the hotels were both renamed on 1 January 2002, with The Westin Plaza becoming Raffles The Plaza and The Westin Stamford becoming Swissôtel The Stamford. Raffles The Plaza was renamed again on 12 December 2007, becoming the Fairmont Singapore. In September 2019, Fairmont Singapore completed a renovation of the South Tower.

== Aquaponics Farm ==
Together with Swissotel The Stamford, Fairmont Singapore set up a 450 sq m rooftop aquaponics farm in 2019 where fish and plants are grown together in a closed system. The farm is expected to grow 30% of all vegetables required across the 2 hotels.

== Awards ==
Some of the accolades Fairmont Singapore has received include:

- Singapore's Leading Conference Hotel 2019 (World Travel Awards 2019)
- Awarded the Friend of the Arts award (The Patron of the Arts 2019 Awards)
- Top 5 City Hotels in Singapore (Travel + Leisure's World's Best Awards 2019)
- Singapore's Leading Conference Hotel (World Travel Awards 2018)
- Top 25 Hotels in Singapore (TripAdvisor's Travellers' Choice Awards 2019, 2018, 2017, 2016)
- Four-Star Rating (FORBES Travel Guide 2018, 2015, 2014)
- Best Wedding Venue (Singapore Tatler's Best of Singapore 2017)
- BCA Green Mark Award 2017 (Gold) for Raffles City Convention Centre
- Certificate of Excellence Hall of Fame (Five-Time Winner, TripAdvisor 2015)
- Best in Stay Award (Orbitz Worldwide 2015)
- Top 10 Hotels in Singapore (Condé Nast Travellers Reader's Choice Award 2015)
