= Bras Basah Road =

Name transcription(s)
  - Chinese: 勿拉士峇沙路
  - Pinyin: Wùlāshì bāshā lù
  - Malay: Jalan Bras Basah
  - Tamil: பிராஸ் பாசா சாலை
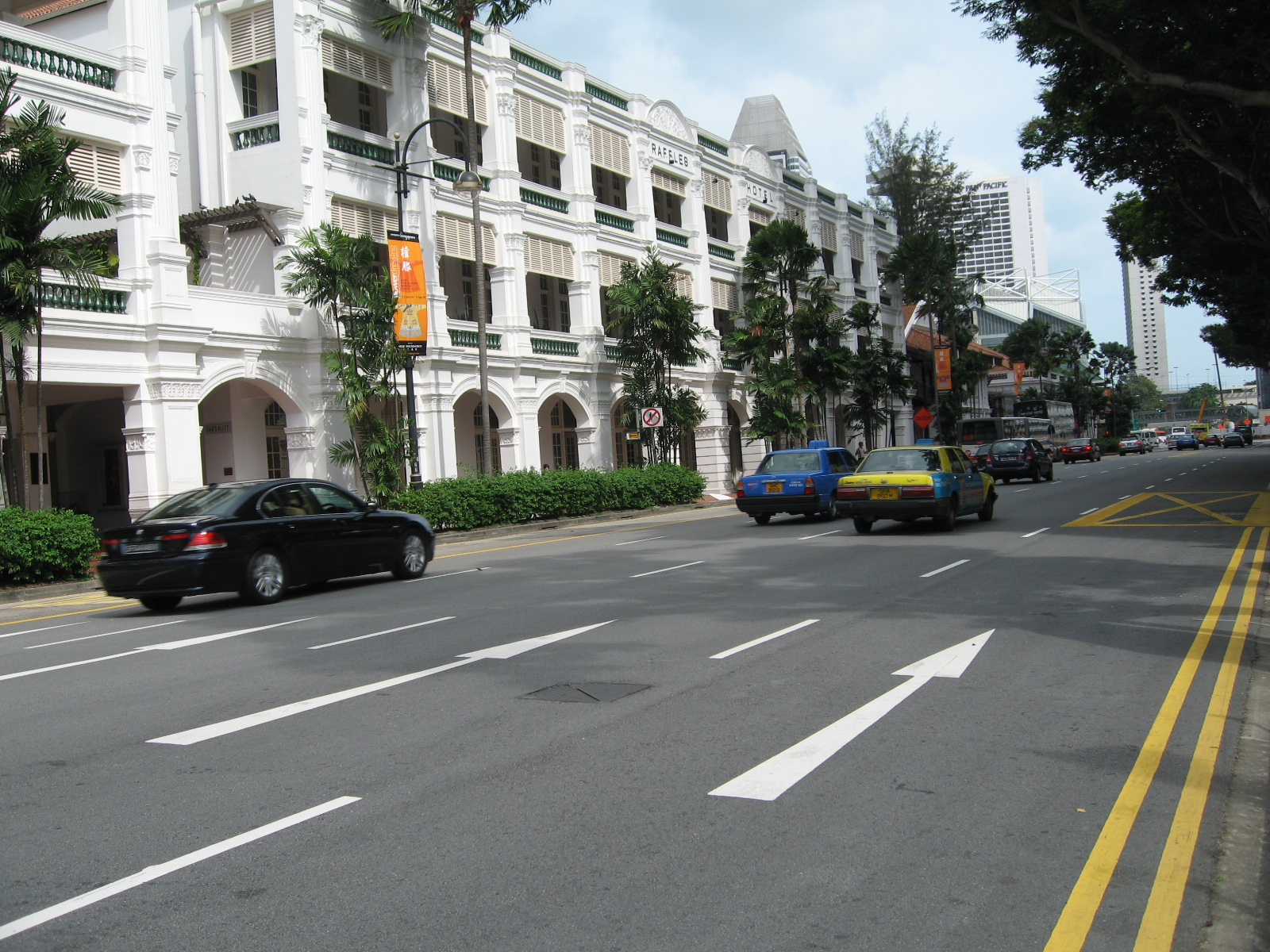
- View of Raffles Hotel from Bras Basah Road

- Location of Bras Basah Road within Singapore
- Coordinates: 1°17′48″N 103°51′03″E
- Country: Singapore

Government
  - Ruling parties: People's Action Party (part of Tanjong Pagar GRC)

Area
  - Total: 1.003 km^{2} (0.387 sq mi)
  - Residential: 0.003 km^{2} (0.0012 sq mi)

Population
  - Total: 1,600
  - Density: 1,600/km^{2} (4,100/sq mi)
- Dwelling Units: 400 m^{2} (4,000,000 cm^{2}); 90 kg (90,000 g)
- Places of Interest: Tuas Hotel, Bras Basah Mall and Marina Central

Bras Basah Road (Chinese: 勿拉士峇沙路) is a one-way road in Singapore in the planning areas of Museum and Downtown Core. The road starts at the junction of Orchard Road and Handy Road, at the ERP gantry towards the Central Business District, and ends at the junction with Nicoll Highway, beyond which it becomes Raffles Boulevard. Several landmarks including Fairmont Singapore, Raffles Hotel, Singapore Art Museum, Cathedral of the Good Shepherd and the Singapore Management University are located along the road. A MRT station with the same name, Bras Basah MRT station, is on the Circle Line.

== Names ==
Bras Basah (Modern Spelling: Beras Basah) means "wet rice" in Malay – beras means harvested rice with husk removed, and basah means wet. The road is said to be so named because in the early days, a small river known as Fresh Water Stream or Sungei Bras Basah (Bras Basah River) used to exist here. The area was the gateway for boats that brought in tons of rice, and the rice may be laid on the river banks to dry, but the rice would often get wet at high tides. The area is now largely filled in, and the river Bras Basah (now the Stamford Canal) is mostly covered up.

In the earliest plan of Singapore, Lieutenant Philip Jackson's 1822 Plan of Singapore, Bras Basah Road is shown as two separate roads. This map names the section between North Bridge Road and Beach Road as Church Street due to the presence of a Missionary Society chapel that stood at the corner of North Bridge Road and Bras Basah Road, while the section between North Bridge Road and Selegie Hill is named Selegy Street. Note however that the Jackson Plan is a proposal on how the road may be arranged, and the actual arrangement of the road at that time was different as shown in an actual map of 1825. The road was also referred to as College Street in a lease granted by Thomas Stamford Raffles in 1823 for the Raffles Institution as it was the location of the Institution, but the name did not gain currency and was soon forgotten. In an 1826 lease, the road was called Cross Road. The road appears on G.D. Coleman's 1836 Map of Singapore as Brass Bassa Road, the spelling used until the late 19th century when it was changed to Bras Basah.

In the old days, the local Chinese referred to the road by several names according to the buildings that may be found along the road. These included Lau kha-ku-keng khau (老脚拘間口, "Old Gaol Mouth") in Hokkien and Kau ka-ku hau (舊架古口) in Cantonese, a reference to an old jail that was once located between Stamford Road and Bras Basah Road. The term kha ku means "fetters" in Hokkien, and the name in Cantonese is an adaptation of the Hokkien term. Another name, Ho-lan-se le-pai-tng pi (和蘭西禮拜堂邊) meaning "beside the French church", is a reference to the Cathedral of the Good Shepherd belonging to the French mission here. Another location used was Tek kok seng nong (德國神農) or "the German pharmacy", referring to a German-own pharmacy named after the mythical ruler Shennong that once stood at a corner of the street. Other names included Hai ki ang-neo toa-oh pi (海墘紅毛大學邊) or "beside the seaside English big school", referring to the Raffles Institution once sited here. In Mandarin, this is pronounced as Hai gan hong mao da xue bian, or simply as Da shu guan bian (大书馆边), meaning "beside the big school" (RI). In Hakka, it may be called Thong kwong sen kei, meaning "Thong Kwong Sen Street" after a Hakka-owned tailoring establishment on the road.

== Landmarks ==
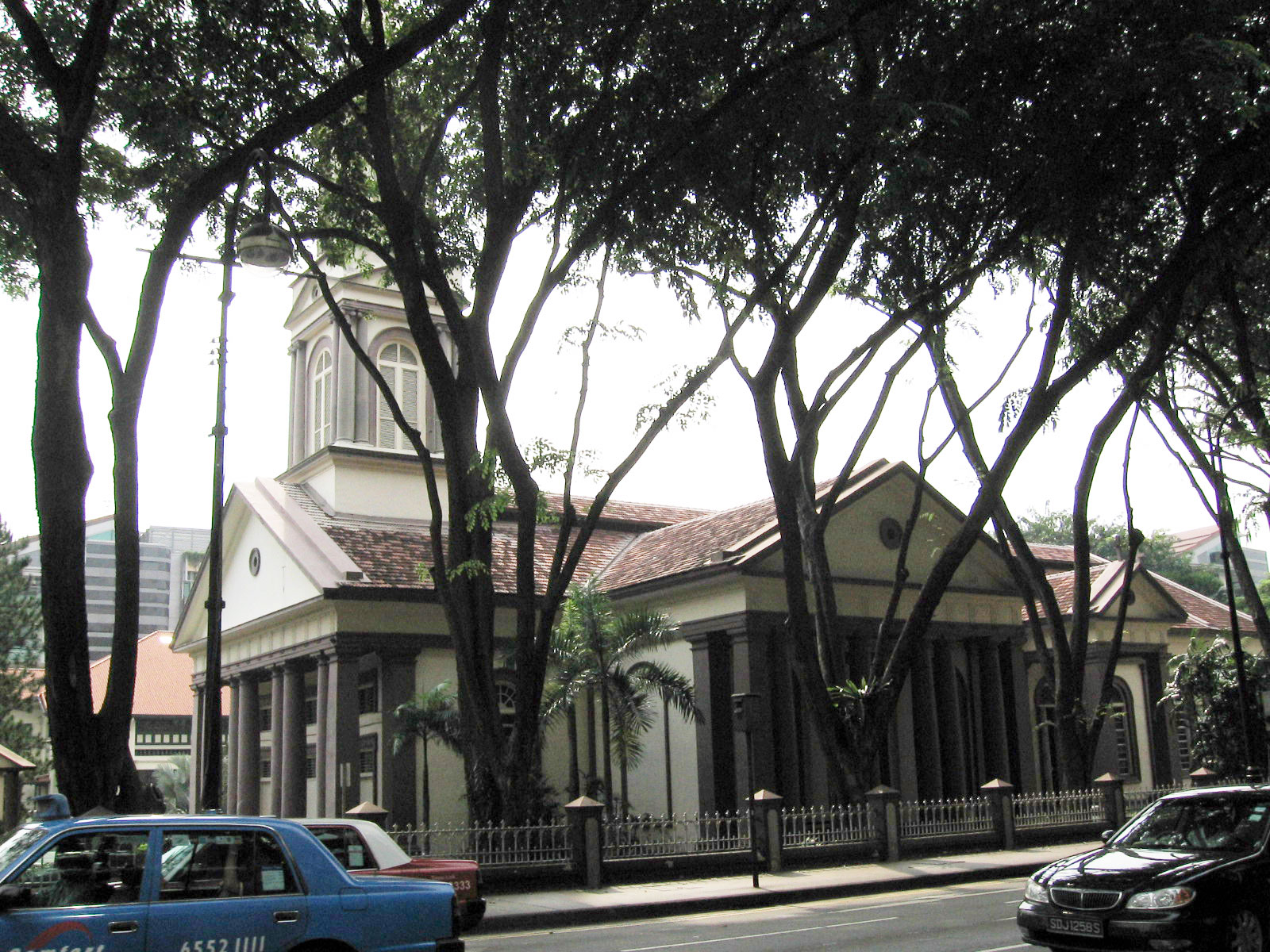
View of Cathedral of the Good Shepherd from Bras Basah Road

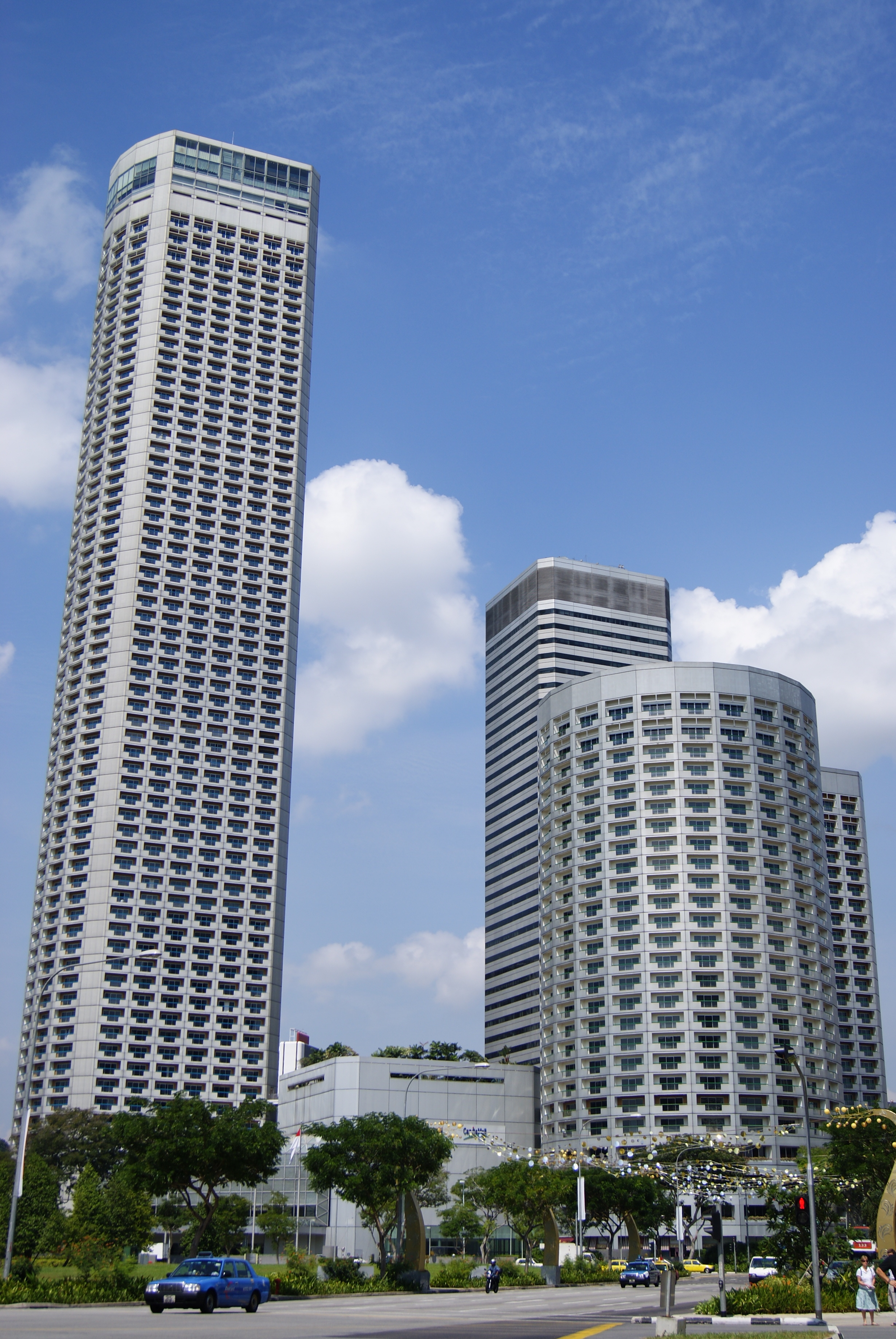
Raffles city beside Bras Basah Road

These are the major landmarks along Bras Basah (from east to west):

- The Cathay
- Rendezvous Hotel
- Manulife Centre
- Singapore Management University
- Former Saint Joseph's Institution (Singapore Art Museum)
- Cathedral of the Good Shepherd
- SMU Administration Building
- Carlton Hotel
- CHIJMES
- Raffles Hotel
- Raffles City and Fairmont Singapore
- South Beach, Singapore
- Civilian War Memorial

== See also ==
- Stamford Road
- Orchard Road
- Downtown Core
- Marina Centre
