= City Hall MRT station =

Mass Rapid Transit station in Singapore

City Hall NS25 EW13 政府大厦 நகர மண்டபம்
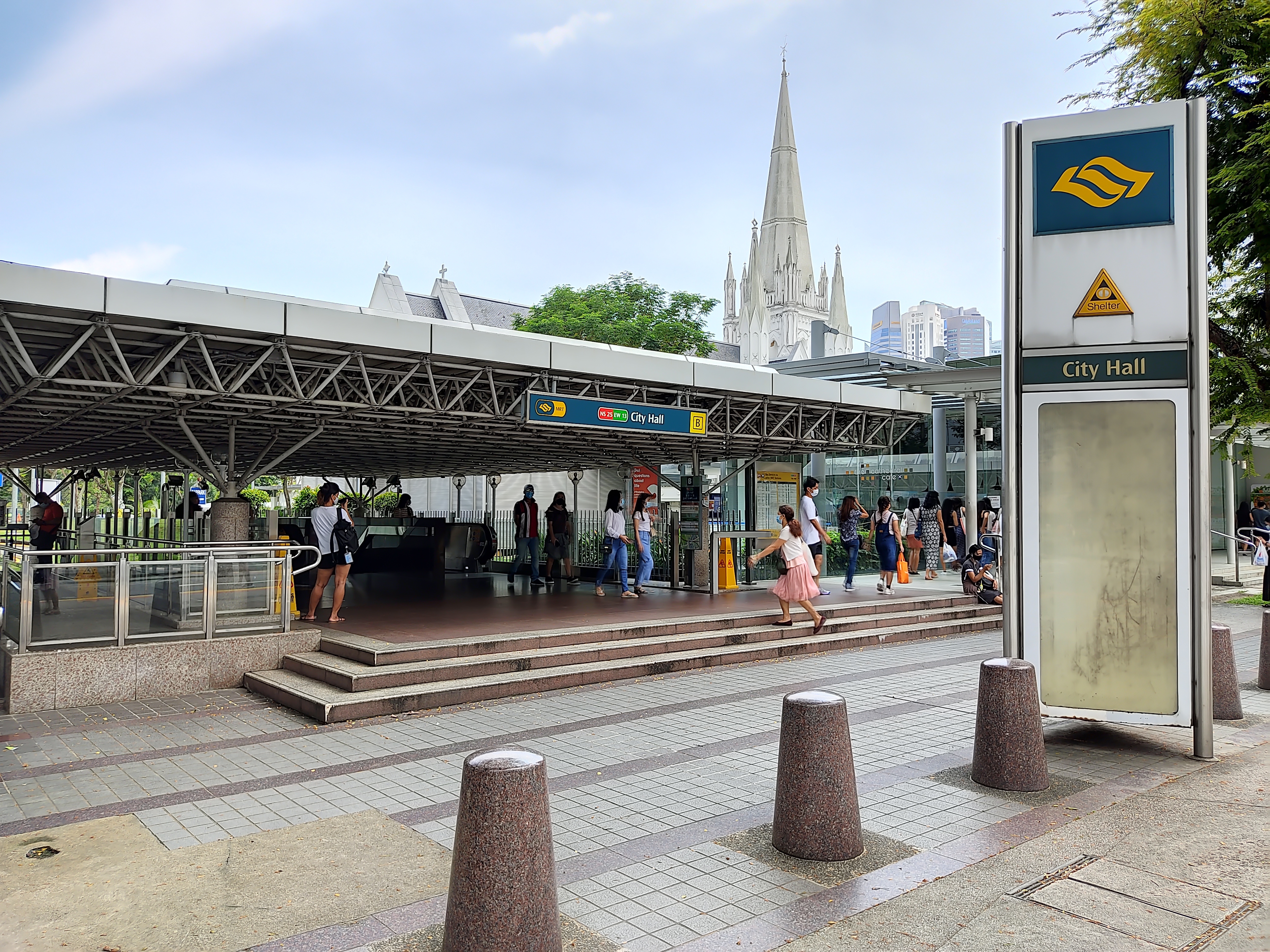
- Exit B of City Hall MRT station with St Andrew's Cathedral in the background

General information
- Location: 150 North Bridge Road; Singapore 179100
- Coordinates: 01°17′36″N 103°51′08″E
- System: Mass Rapid Transit (MRT) interchange
- Operator: SMRT Trains Ltd (SMRT Corporation)
- Line: North–South Line East–West Line
- Platforms: 4 (2 island platforms)
- Tracks: 4
- Connections: CC3 Esplanade (underground walkway); Bus, Taxi

Construction
- Structure type: Underground
- Depth: 22 metres (72 ft)
- Platform levels: 2
- Parking: Yes (Raffles City)
- Cycle facilities: No
- Accessible: Yes

History
- Opened: 12 December 1987; 38 years ago
- Former names: St. Andrew's

Passengers
- August 2023: 42,420 per day

Services
Preceding station	Mass Rapid Transit	Following station
Dhoby Ghaut towards Jurong East	North–South Line	Raffles Place towards Marina South Pier
Bugis towards Pasir Ris	East–West Line	Raffles Place towards Tuas Link
Track layout
Location
- Location within Singapore Rail central area

City Hall MRT station is an underground Singapore Mass Rapid Transit (MRT) interchange station on the North–South Line (NSL) and East–West Line (EWL). Situated in the Downtown Core district, it is underneath Stamford Road near the road junctions with North Bridge Road and St Andrew's Road. The station is near landmarks such as the former City Hall, Raffles City, the Padang, St Andrew's Cathedral and the Cenotaph.

Initially named St Andrew's, the station was included in the early plans for the original MRT network in 1982. Construction of the tunnels between the City Hall and Raffles Place stations required the draining of the Singapore River. The station opened on 12 December 1987 as part of the MRT extension to Outram Park station. Cross-platform transfers between the NSL and EWL began on 28 October 1989, ahead of the opening of the MRT eastern line extension to Tanah Merah station on 4 November which split the MRT network into two lines. A designated Civil Defence shelter, the three-level station features a mural by Simon Wong which depicts government buildings in the area.

== History ==
=== Planning ===
The station, then named St Andrew's, was included in the early plans of the MRT network in May 1982. It was renamed to City Hall in November that year for historical reasons and to better reflect the area served. It was to be constructed as part of the Phase I MRT segment from the Novena to Outram Park stations; this segment was targeted to be completed by December 1987. This segment was given priority as it passes through areas that had a higher demand for public transport, such as the densely populated housing estates of Toa Payoh and Ang Mo Kio and the Central Area. The line aimed to relieve the traffic congestion on the Thomson–Sembawang road corridor.

=== Construction ===
The contract for the construction of four 800-metre (870 yd) tunnels between the City Hall and Raffles Place stations was awarded to a joint venture between Kajima Corporation and Keppel Shipyard in October 1983 for S$35.65 million (US$50 million in 2022). Another contract for the construction of the station was awarded to a joint venture between Nishimatsu and Lum Chang at S$77.65 million (US$105 million in 2022) in May 1984. Construction of the station began on 7 September 1984 with a Christian ceremony near the St Andrew's Cathedral. The gathering prayed for the safety of the cathedral and the construction workers, the successful completion of the station, and blessings for future commuters.

The construction of tunnels between the City Hall and Raffles Place stations required the draining of the Singapore River. The contractor used the cut-and-cover construction method since the tunnels, which cross over one another, would pass through a shallow part of the river. The tunnel boring machine was launched from Empress Place located by the river bank. Due to the acidity of the Singapore River, a layer of concrete was added to the frame around the tunnels, with a waterproofing additive for the base slab concrete. The frame was designed to prevent any corrosion and floatation of the tunnels.

Due to requirements by the Ministry of Environment ensuring that the work site did not occupy more than 40% of the river width, the work was originally planned to proceed in three stages. The cofferdam in the first stage occupied about 20 metres (66 ft) of the river width from the riverbank at the Immigration Building site of Empress Place. However, this restriction led to a limited work area. The installation of piles was hindered by the boulders in the river, which were drilled through. The works were close to the historical monuments of the Immigration Building and the Cavenagh Bridge. These two sites had to be closely monitored for any ground movement. Monitoring instruments such as inclinometers and levelling pins were used to detect any structural movement.

There were concerns that the Cavenagh Bridge would not be able to absorb any significant strains with the settlement of the bridge's anchor blocks. Saddles, joined by prestressing cables, were placed on either side of the bridge to unload and loosen the links and bridge wedges. However, these wedges could not be loosened. Instead, other temporary supports were placed to relieve any stress on the bridge. After finding some cracks on the entrance façade of the Immigration Building, the contractors underpinned the columns at the entrance.

Construction work at the Empress Place and City Hall construction sites uncovered fragmented pieces of Celadon pottery dating back to the Song and Yuan dynasties of China. Another stoneware jar, which retained its original bronze glaze but was missing its handles, was also uncovered at the Empress Place site. The artefacts were donated to the National Museum of Singapore.

After a seven-month delay, the first stage of the construction was completed in May 1985. To speed up the construction, the Environment Ministry agreed to lift workspace restrictions. The rest of the construction was completed in one stage, taking up the remaining 70 metres (230 ft) of the river width. The subsequent stage also used fewer piles with the mixed use of cut slopes. Installation of the second stage cofferdam began in May and works were completed within 12 months.

==== Incidents ====
During the station's construction, on 26 May 1985, the collapse of a portion of the supporting wall led to a landslip at the construction site. Those in the nearby St Andrew's Cathedral were evacuated as a safety precaution. The cathedral was eventually declared safe for use, and operations resumed on 2 June with the collapsed area backfilled. The engineers for the construction advised the Cathedral against using half of the church near the site. On 10 December, a Japanese foreman miner died, having fallen through a shaft. Investigators noted that he did not have his safety belt fastened, and with all other safety measures observed, it was ruled an accident.

=== Opening and additional exits ===
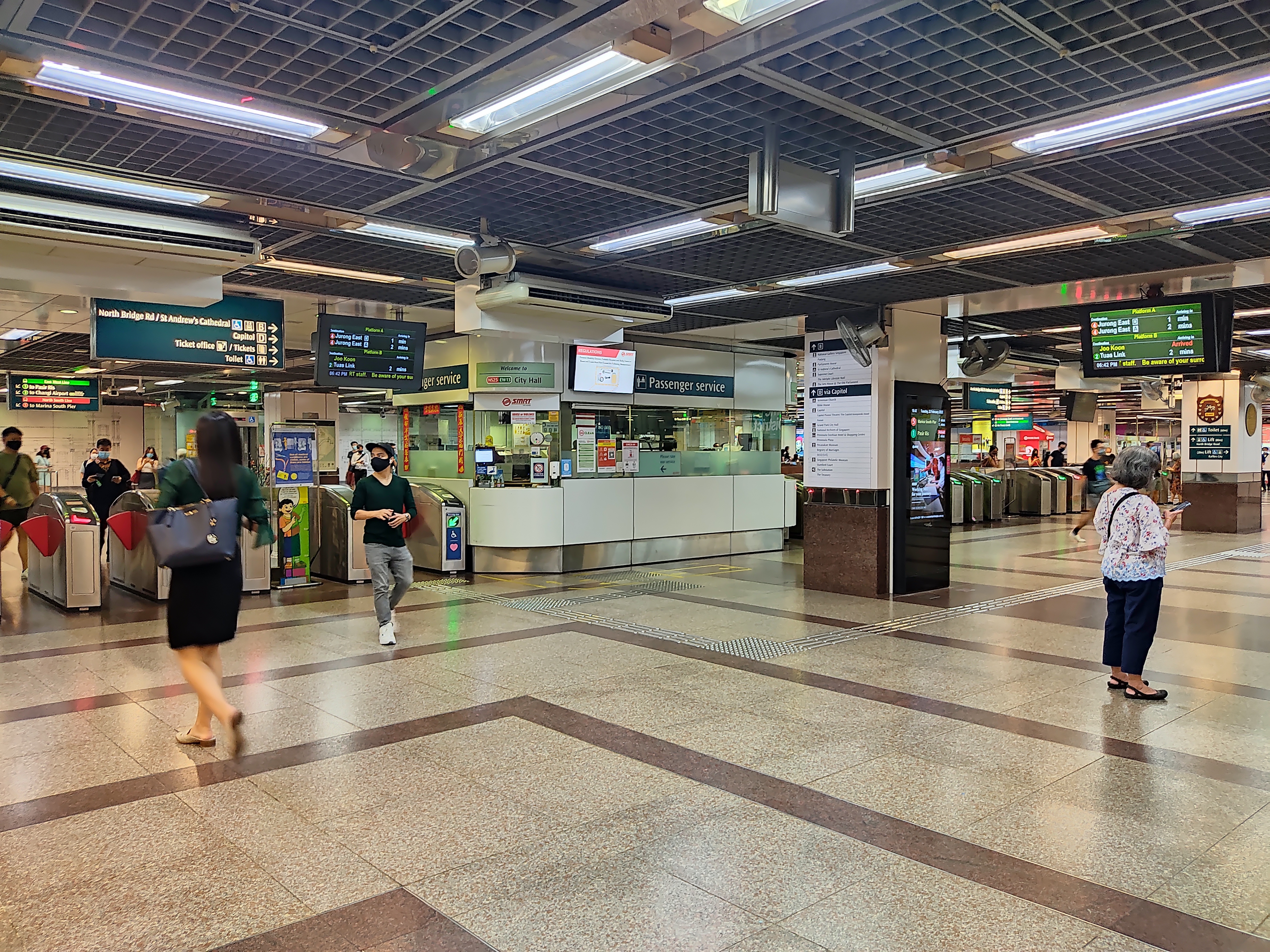
Concourse level of the station

Train services commenced on 12 December 1987 when the line extension to Outram Park station was completed. The station was part of a route that ran continuously from Yishun station in the north to Lakeside station in the west. From 28 October 1989, it serves as the interchange station for both the East–West (EWL) and North–South (NSL) lines with the split of MRT operations. (Note: The MRT system was split into EWL (running from Tanah Merah station to Lakeside) and the NSL (running from Yishun station to Marina Bay).) Prime Minister Lee Kuan Yew held an official inauguration ceremony for the MRT system at Raffles City on 12 March 1988 before he took a train ride from this station to Queenstown station.

The LTA announced plans in May 2014 to construct a new underpass between the station and the redeveloped Capitol Singapore. Construction of the underground link and the new entrance started in the fourth quarter of 2014, and was completed in the first quarter of 2015. Another linkway to Funan Centre was first announced in November 2017 and was completed in December 2021.

== Station details ==
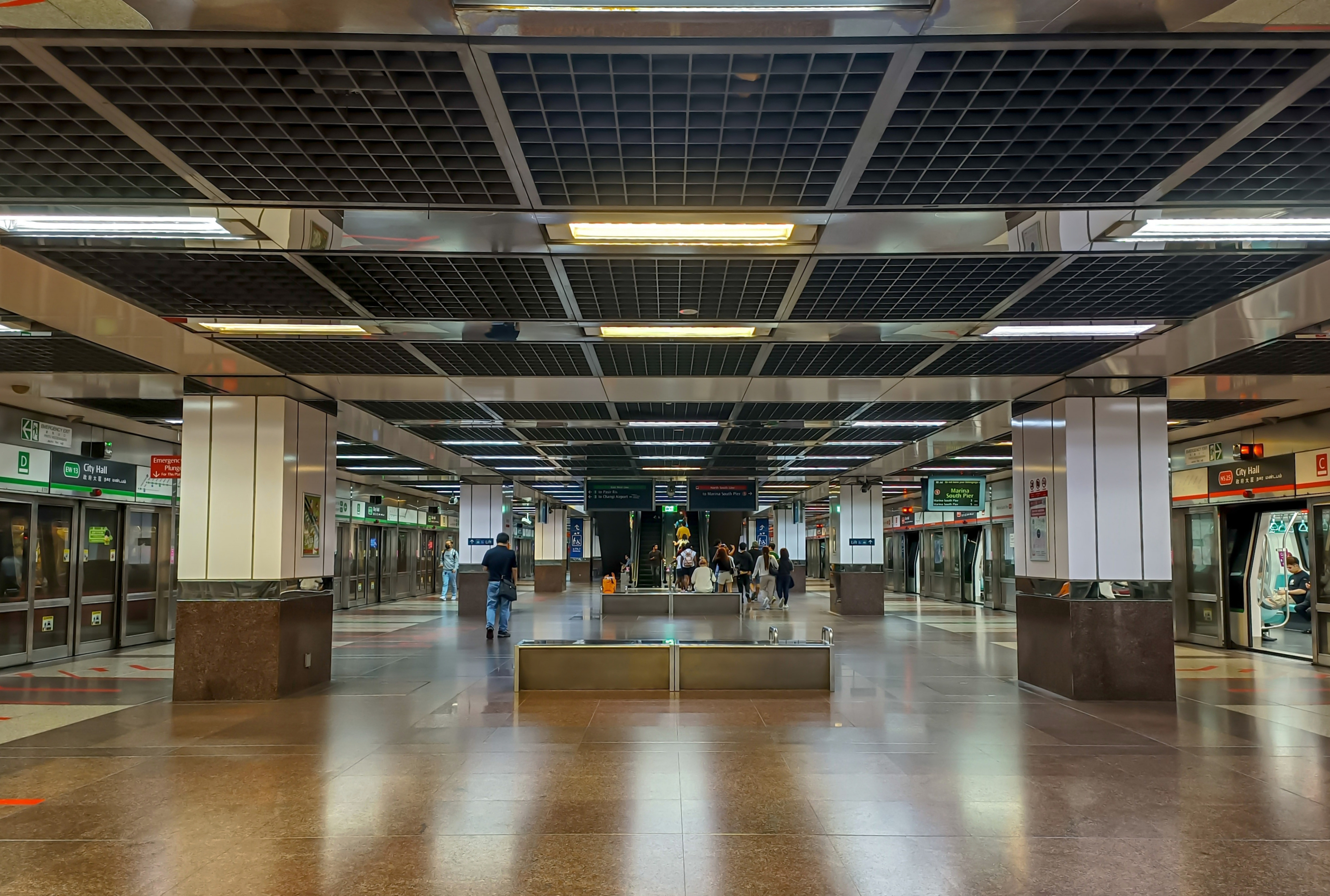
Lower platform level of the station

City Hall station is one of two stations which are paired cross-platform interchanges between the NSL and EWL. From the north, the station is after Bugis on the EWL and after Dhoby Ghaut station on the NSL. Both lines continue and interchange at Raffles Place station. The official station code is NS25/EW13. When it opened, it had the station code of C2 before being changed to its current station code in August 2001 as a part of a system-wide campaign to cater to the expanding MRT System. Before the MRT eastern extension to Tanah Merah station and the Marina Bay southern extension on 4 November 1989, through services operated from the Yishun to Lakeside stations. A few days before the MRT extension, transfer drills were launched on 28 October for commuters to familiarise themselves with transferring between the two services – passengers from Yishun have to alight at either Raffles Place or City Hall to continue their journey to Lakeside or vice versa. In addition to advertisement campaigns and guides about the transfers, Mass Rapid Transit Corporation (MRTC) staff were deployed at the platforms to help commuters.

At a depth of 22 metres (72 ft), the station has three levels, two of which are island platforms. The station has one of the MRT system's longest escalators at 11.6 metres (38 ft). City Hall is one of the first nine underground MRT stations designated as a Civil Defence (CD) shelter. As a CD shelter, the station has to be structurally reinforced against bomb attacks with layers of earth-backed, air-backed and airtight walls and slabs.

A mural by Simon Wong is displayed at this station as part of the MRTC's S$2 million (US$3 million in 2022) commission of artworks at six MRT stations along the NSL in 1987. The mural, depicting government buildings in the area, reflects the station's themes of governance, justice and administration. Another mural by Kelvin Lee is displayed as part of SMRT's Comic Connect – a public art showcase of heritage-themed murals. The work depicts former and existing landmarks of Singapore's Civil District, including the Old Raffles Institution Building, the Old National Library Building, CHIJMES and the Capitol Theatre.

The station has four entrances. Located in the Singapore Civic District, the station is underneath Stamford Road near the junction with North Bridge Road. Surrounding the station are cultural landmarks such as the former City Hall, Peranakan Museum, the Padang, St Andrew's Cathedral, National Gallery Singapore, Old Supreme Court Building, Supreme Court of Singapore, Parliament House and the Cenotaph. Nearby commercial and retail developments include Marina Square, One Raffles Link, Raffles City and Suntec City. The station is within walking distance of the Esplanade and Bras Basah stations on the Circle Line. Underground connections are provided to Esplanade station via either CityLink Mall or Raffles City Basement 2.

== Notes and references ==
=== Bibliography ===
- Information portfolio. Singapore: Mass Rapid Transit Corporation. 1984.
- Mass Rapid Transit System: Proceedings of the Singapore Mass Rapid Transit Conference. Singapore: Mass Rapid Transit Corporation. 1987. ISBN 9971-84-636-5. OCLC 82363485.
