= South Beach (Singapore) =

Mixed-use development in Singapore

Coordinates: 1°17′42″N 103°51′22″E

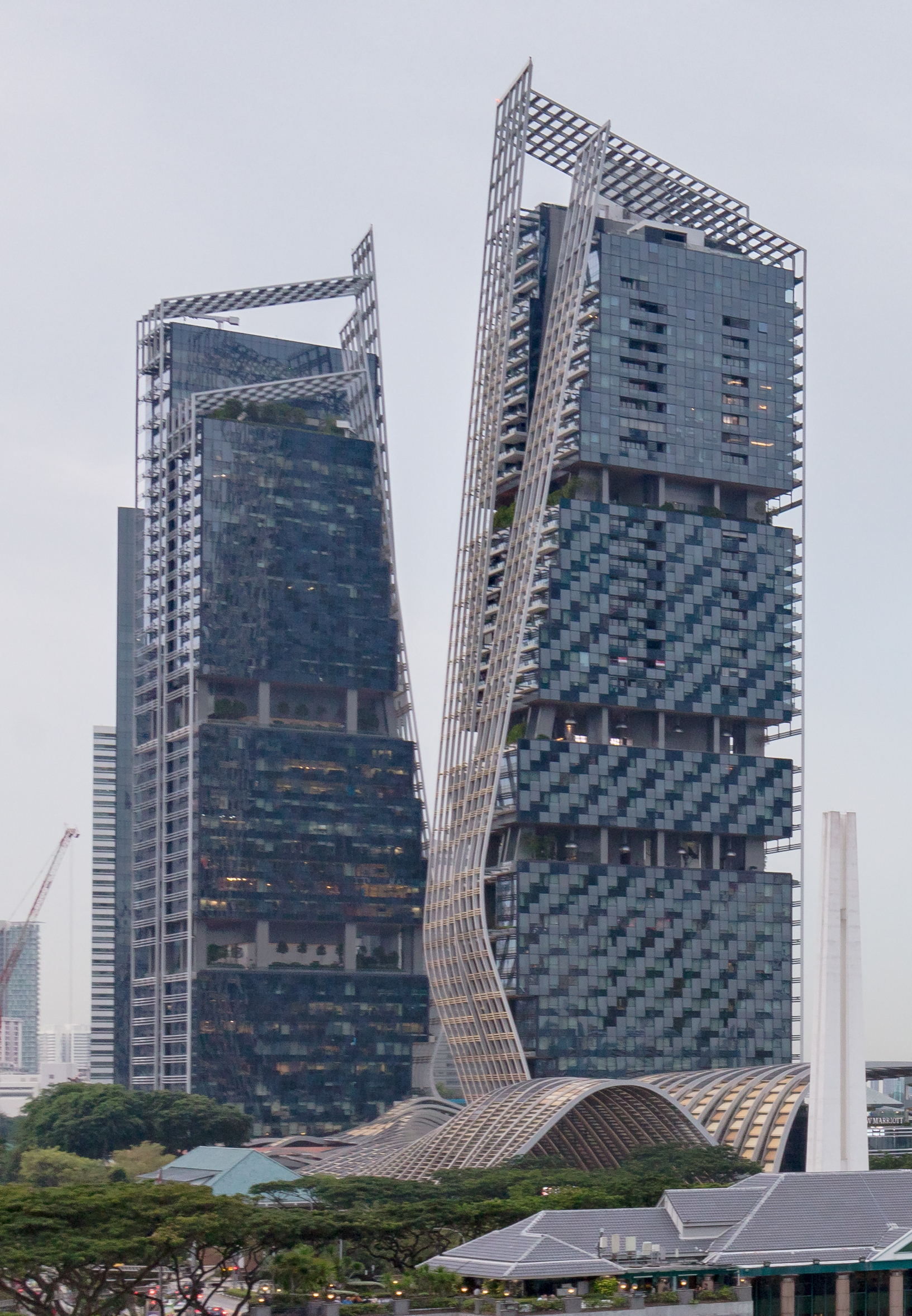
South Beach Towers in 2023

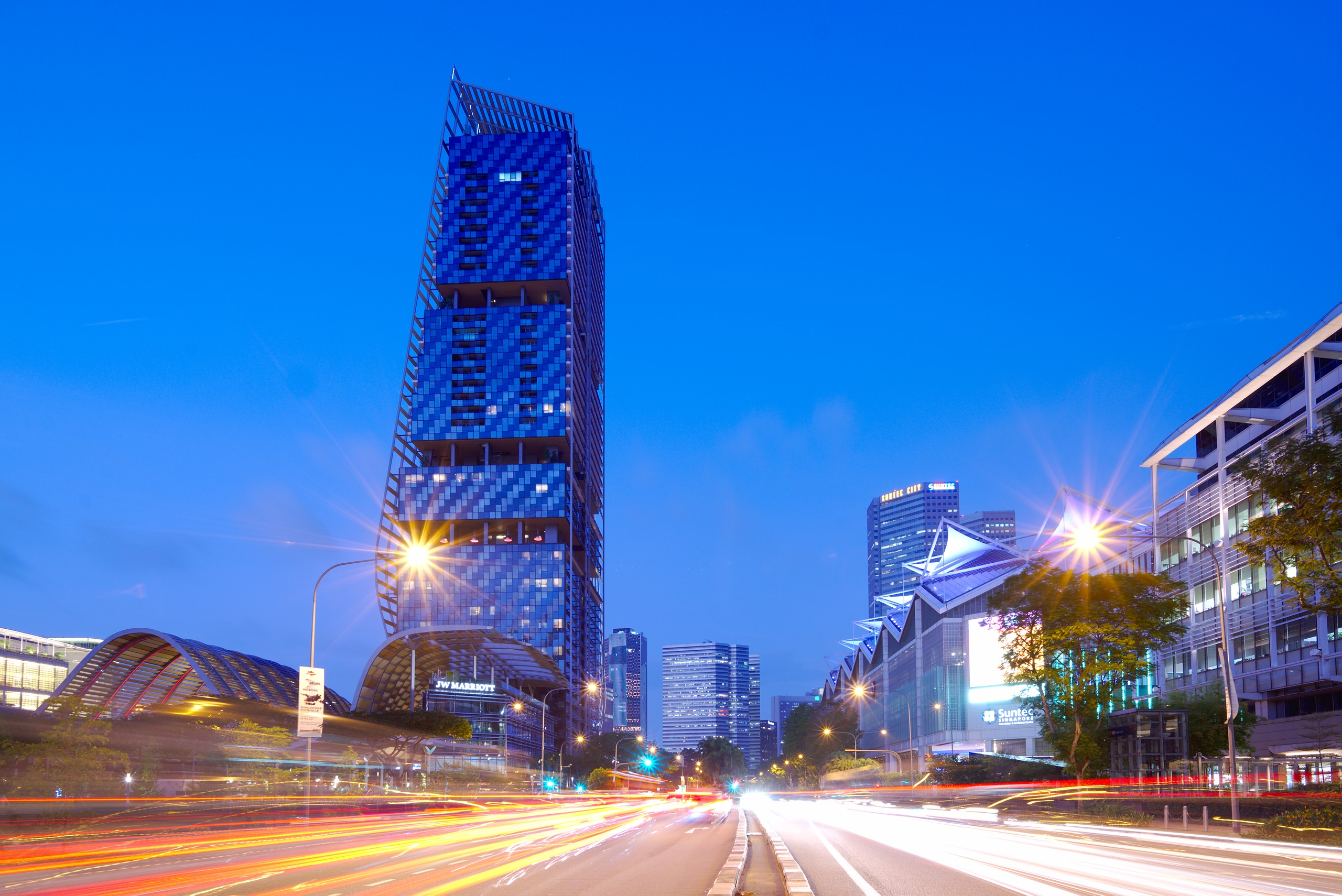
A view of South Beach from Nicoll Highway, Singapore.

South Beach is a commercial and residential complex located on Beach Road in the Downtown Core of Singapore. It is composed of a hotel tower managed by JW Marriott Hotels, an office tower, shops and residences. The project includes the restoration of four conservation buildings – the former Non-Commissioned Officers' Club building and part of the former Beach Road Camp. It is accessible from Esplanade MRT station.

The complex was designed by Foster + Partners and completed in 2016.

== History ==
=== Site history ===
The four conservation buildings comprise three 1930s army blocks (Blocks 1, 9 and 14) and the former NCO Club built in 1952. The old concrete buildings were given conservation status in 2002 due to their rich historical and architectural significance. The Beach Road camp was the venue for the first National Service enlistment in 1967. The former NCO Club was originally designed as the headquarters of the Navy, Army and Air Force Institutes in Singapore, and had a swimming pool. The army blocks are in Art Deco style known for elegant, functional features, while the club is a hybrid of that and what came in the 1950s, called Modern architecture.

=== Site plans ===
On 27–29 September 2006, the Urban Redevelopment Authority (URA) showcased the Beach Road site at the "Marché international des professionnels de l'immobilier" (MIPIM) Asia in Hong Kong. MIPIM Asia is the Asia-Pacific version of MIPIM, an international property exhibition held in Cannes every year.

The 3.5-hectare land parcel is bounded by Beach Road, Bras Basah Road, Nicoll Highway and Middle Road, and is located next to Esplanade MRT station. URA has planned the site for a mixed-use development comprising prime office space and high-end hotel rooms. The conserved buildings on the site would enhance the uniqueness of the development. The new integrated development would offer a mixture of low-rise conservation and medium to high rise buildings for commercial and hotel uses. URA required the developers to set aside at least 40% of the space for office use, and at least 30% of the space must be for hotel rooms.

=== Site tender ===
The site was launched for tender in March 2007, and was awarded through a "two-envelope" system, where the bids were first evaluated based on their concept proposals before the bid prices were made known. Proposals were assessed on their contribution to the city's skyline profile, the provision of attractive public spaces and high-quality architecture.

When the tender closed in July 2007, URA received seven submissions from major developers and firms. Five were rejected even though some of them came with higher bids; these included a joint venture between Pontiac Land Group and Morgan Stanley, CapitaLand, one of two bids from a joint venture between Keppel Land and Hong Kong's Cheung Kong Holdings, and two bids by Overseas Union Enterprise. The winning bid was the higher of two remaining tender submissions shortlisted by URA for their acceptable concept proposals.

Won by a consortium led by City Developments Limited, the winning bid of S$1.689 billion worked out to about S$1,069 per square foot of potential gross floor area. Construction of the 99-year leasehold development, which was named "South Beach" and has a gross floor area of 146,827 square metres (1,580,433 square feet), started in 2012. CDL tied up with Dubai World's Istithmar Beach Road FZE and Elad Group Singapore, and tendered via Scottsdale Properties. Second-place Keppel Land and partner Cheung Kong Holdings lost out with their bid of S$1.386 billion. CDL estimated that its investment in the South Beach project would cost at least S$2.73 billion.

== Architecture ==
The development features two new towers, 45 storeys and 42 storeys tall, which house two luxury hotels, offices and apartments. The original conserved military buildings of the old Beach Road Camp were restored for retail and hotel-related uses such as function rooms. The project has added at least 46,450 square metres (500,000 square feet) of new office space and about 700 to 800 hotel rooms.

The CDL Consortium has proposed to adopt an environmental design and green technology to create a distinctive, high-quality development that fits in well with Singapore's tropical climate and urban context. Designed by British architectural firm Foster and Partners, a key feature of the winning design is a large "environmental filter" canopy that covers the open spaces, linking conservation buildings with the two high-rise towers and providing shelter from the elements and drawing air currents to cool the area beneath it. The canopy rises at some areas and lowers at others, resembling huge waves. Some parts of the canopy hover around one conservation block, another covers it, while yet another part appears to go into a block. Other parts of the canopy also appear to rise skywards, covering part of the façades of the two new towers.

The two towers will have slanting façades to catch winds and direct air flow to the ground-level spaces. The building façades will also incorporate photovoltaic cells. Rainwater will be collected off the towers and the canopy to flow into a holding tank underground, instead of being wasted.

The first storey will be laid out with a series of internal streets, with the aim of enhancing street level vibrancy and allowing pedestrians to move about easily. A pedestrian "green axis" arises upwards from the basement MRT station exit through multi-tiered gardens. The block layout features alleyways reminiscent of the nearby Seah Street area. It will also feature sunken courtyards, tiered gardens lined with shops, and food and beverage outlets.
