= Marina Square =

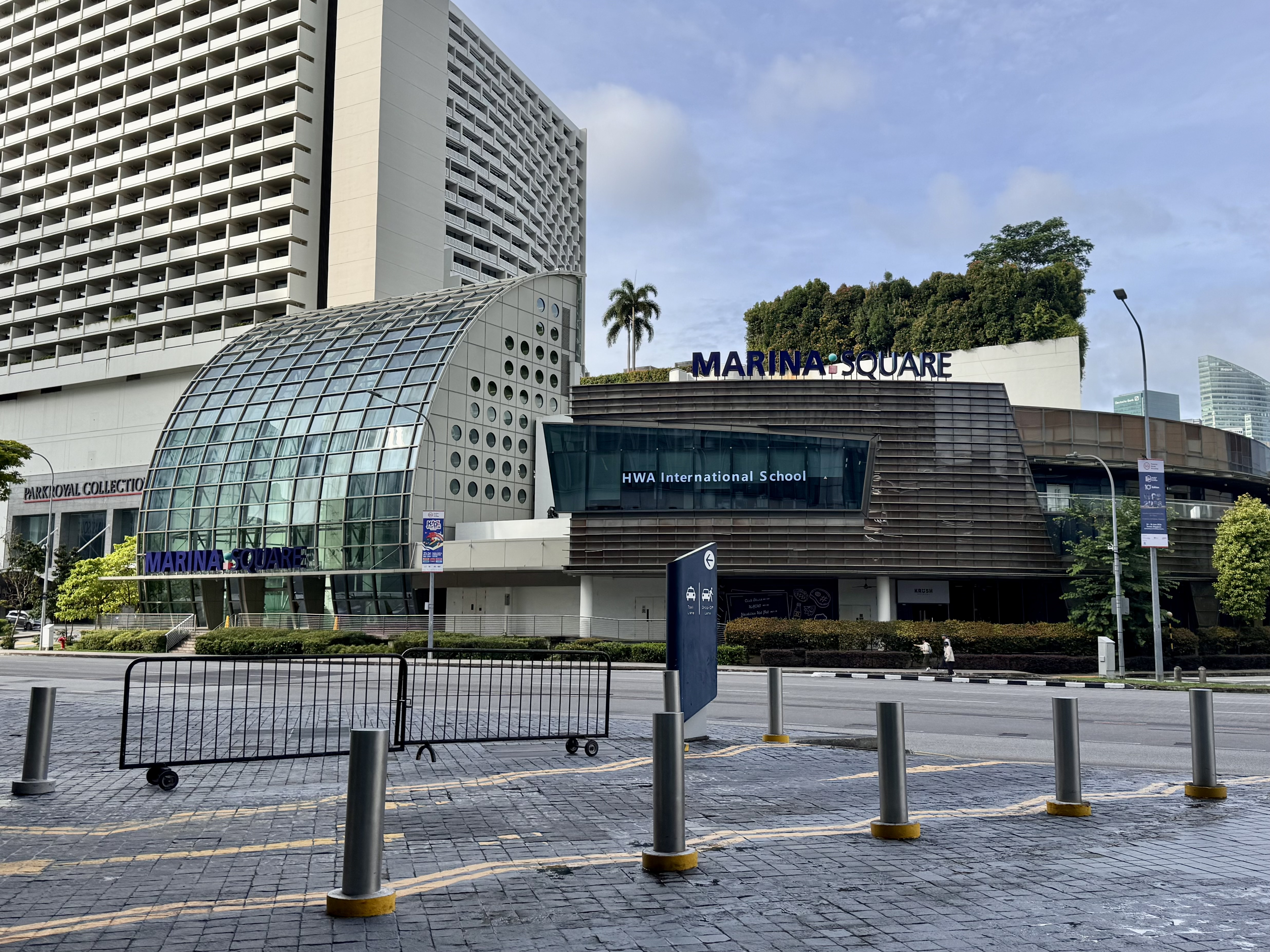
- Marina Square in 2026
- Location: Marina Centre, Singapore
- Coordinates: 1°17′28″N 103°51′27″E
- Address: 6 Raffles Boulevard, Singapore 039594
- Opened: December 1986; 39 years ago
- Closed: 31 March 2027; 4 months' time (scheduled)
- Developer: Singapore Land Group
- Manager: Singapore Land Group
- Owner: Singapore Land Group
- Num. of anchor tenants: 5
- Floor area: 700,000 square feet (65,000 m^{2})
- Floors: 5
- Public transit: CC3 Esplanade
- Website: www.marinasquare.com.sg

Marina Square is a shopping mall in Singapore which opened in the late 1980s. It is part of the first building complex built on the reclaimed land at Marina Centre, and was the largest shopping mall in the country at the time. The complex also houses three hotels, which are the Mandarin Oriental, Parkroyal Collection Marina Bay and The Pan Pacific Singapore. The shopping mall will close in March 2027.

== History ==
Developed by a consortium of developers headed by Singapore Land, Marina Square was built in 1985 on the then newly reclaimed Marina Centre, as the first major mixed-use complex in the area, along with Marina Mandarin, Mandarin Oriental and The Pan Pacific hotels. It was the largest shopping mall in Singapore and the South East Asia at the time with 59,000 square metres of retail space when it opened in 1986; to improve accessibility, more bus services were introduced to Marina Centre. During the late 1980s and 1990s, it featured anchor tenants Tokyu department store and Metro department store, as well as an open air food court, a Magic Land arcade and a twin Eng Wah Cinema which was closed in 1993.

The Tokyu store was replaced by The Sale Store, followed by American retailer Kmart in May 1994, which was then replaced by MegaMart. NTUC Fairprice later took over the space occupied by MegaMart, and the Giant hypermarket later took over the same premises.

In September 1996, an entertainment complex, Marina Leisureplex, opened at the eastern end of the mall, comprising a six-screen Golden Village cineplex, a Superbowl arcade and bowling alley.

In early 2004, the mall started its first major upgrading works which were completed in mid-2006. The outdoor food court was converted into an air-conditioned one, and the mall layout reconfigured and remodeled. This also increased the retail space area to 65,000 sq m. A new retail concept was introduced, such as several furniture shops on the 3rd floor. More lifts and escalators were added to enhance accessibility as well.

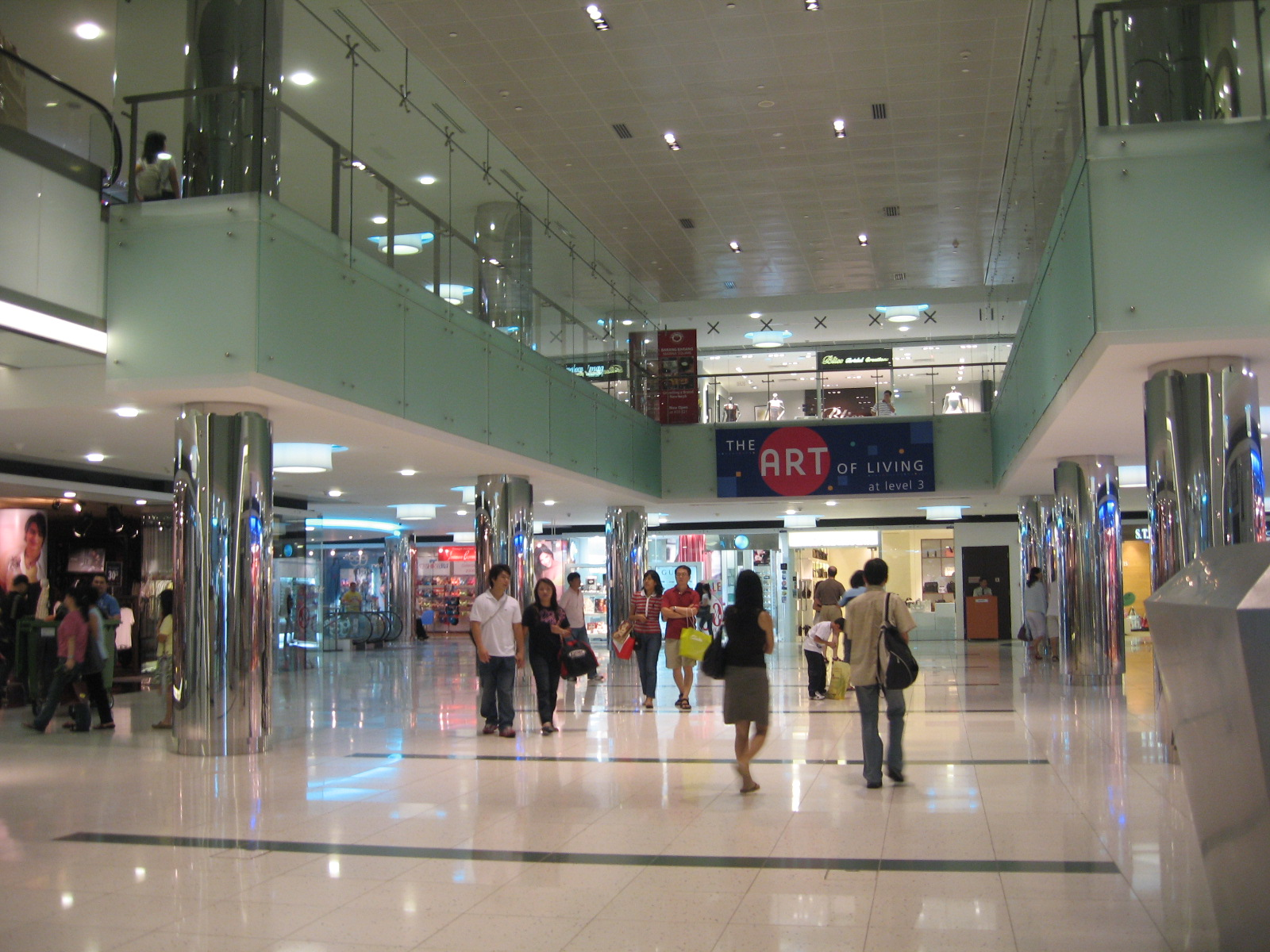
Interior in 2006

The mall has completed its second renovation exercise, thus expanding its floor area to 100,000 sq m and a refreshed tenant mix. Phase 1 introduced a wing dedicated to food and beverage establishments, called the Dining Edition, including some F&B establishments new to Singapore. Renovation began in January 2012 and completed in September 2013. Phase 2 consisted of an extended retail zone and a new retail wing facing Marina Bay. It introduced tenants such as Emporium Shokuhin, a Japanese market and Pororo Park, a theme park dedicated to children. It was completed in November 2015.

Phase 3 of the renovation works consisted of the mall's east wing, which prompted the closure of the Marina Leisureplex (GV Marina Square) and John Little department store. Both tenants vacated the mall in 2014 and have been replaced by PSB Academy's mega city campus. PSB Academy has opened in phases at the end of 2016. In August 2016, a cluster of IT stores displaced by the closure of Funan Digitalife Mall opened, taking up the entirety of level 3 of the East Wing. They include exclusive stores of major computer and laptop brands such as HP, Dell, Acer, Asus and Lenovo, all provided by homegrown retailer Newstead, which closed down in 2019 when after the company had filed for bankruptcy. In September 2018, Emporium Shokuhin has been closed down, and a 18,000 square feet indoor playground, Kiztopia, took over the space and opened on 15 June 2019.

== Closure and redevelopment ==
On 1 September 2026, the Singapore Land Group announced that Marina Square would be closing down on 31 March 2027 as part of a broader redevelopment project. Many tenants, which first heard the rumours as early as a year back, were surprised by the relatively short notice given by the mall, with tenants that have leases past March 2027 concerned if they would be offered compensation. Some parents also complained about the potential lack of play options once the mall closes down.

The existing mall structure would be retained while three new towers for offices, residences, and hotel would be built.

== See also ==
- List of shopping malls in Singapore
