= List of libraries in Singapore =

This is a list of libraries in Singapore:

== National libraries ==
These libraries are managed by the National Library Board.

- National Library, Singapore
- Lee Kong Chian Reference Library

=== Regional libraries ===
- Jurong Library (former Jurong East Community Library)
- Punggol Library
- Tampines Library
- Woodlands Library

=== Public libraries ===
- Ang Mo Kio Library
- Bedok Public Library
- Bishan Public Library
- Bukit Batok Library
- Bukit Panjang Public Library
- Central Arts Library
- Central Public Library
- Cheng San Public Library
- Choa Chu Kang Public Library
- Clementi Public Library
- Geylang East Library
- Jurong West Public Library
- library@chinatown
- library@harbourfront
- Marine Parade Public Library
- Orchard Library
- Pasir Ris Public Library
- Queenstown Public Library
- Sembawang Library
- Serangoon Public Library
- Sengkang Public Library
- Toa Payoh Library
- Yishun Library

== Private libraries ==
=== Academic libraries ===
- Nanyang Technological University
  - Art, Design & Media Library
  - Business Library
  - Chinese Library
  - Communication & Information Library
  - Humanities & Social Sciences Library
  - Lee Wee Nam Library
  - Library Outpost
  - Medical Library
  - Wang Gungwu Library
- National University of Singapore
  - Central Library
  - C J Koh Law Library
  - Hon Sui Sen Memorial Library
  - Medicine+Science Library
  - Music Library
  - Wan Boo Sow Chinese Library (Chinese: 雲茂潮中文图书馆)
  - Yale-NUS College Library
- Singapore Management University
  - Li Ka Shing Library
  - Kwa Geok Choo Law Library
- Singapore University of Technology and Design
  - SUTD Library
- Ngee Ann Polytechnic
  - Lien Ying Chow Library
- Republic Polytechnic
  - Republic Polytechnic Library
- Singapore Institute of Management
  - Tay Eng Soon Library
- Singapore Polytechnic
  - Main Library
- Nanyang Polytechnic
  - Nanyang Polytechnic Library
- Temasek Polytechnic
  - Temasek Polytechnic Library
- Buddhist Library
  - Buddhist Library in Aljunied
- United Chinese Library (Singapore)

=== Specialist libraries ===
- SAFTI Military Institute
  - SAFTI Military Institute Library
- Singapore Botanic Gardens
  - Library of Botany and Horticulture
- Singapore Sports Hub
  - Sports Hub Library

== See also ==
- Library associations in Singapore
- Mass media in Singapore
