= Stamford Constituency =

Singapore electoral district

Stamford
- Former constituency for the Legislative Assembly of Singapore and Parliament of Singapore
- Region: Singapore

Former constituency
- Created: 1955; 71 years ago
- Abolished: 1976; 50 years ago
- Seats: 1
- Replaced by: Rochore Constituency, River Valley Constituency and Telok Ayer Constituency

Stamford Constituency was a constituency in the city-centre of Singapore. It used to exist from 1955 to 1976.

== History ==
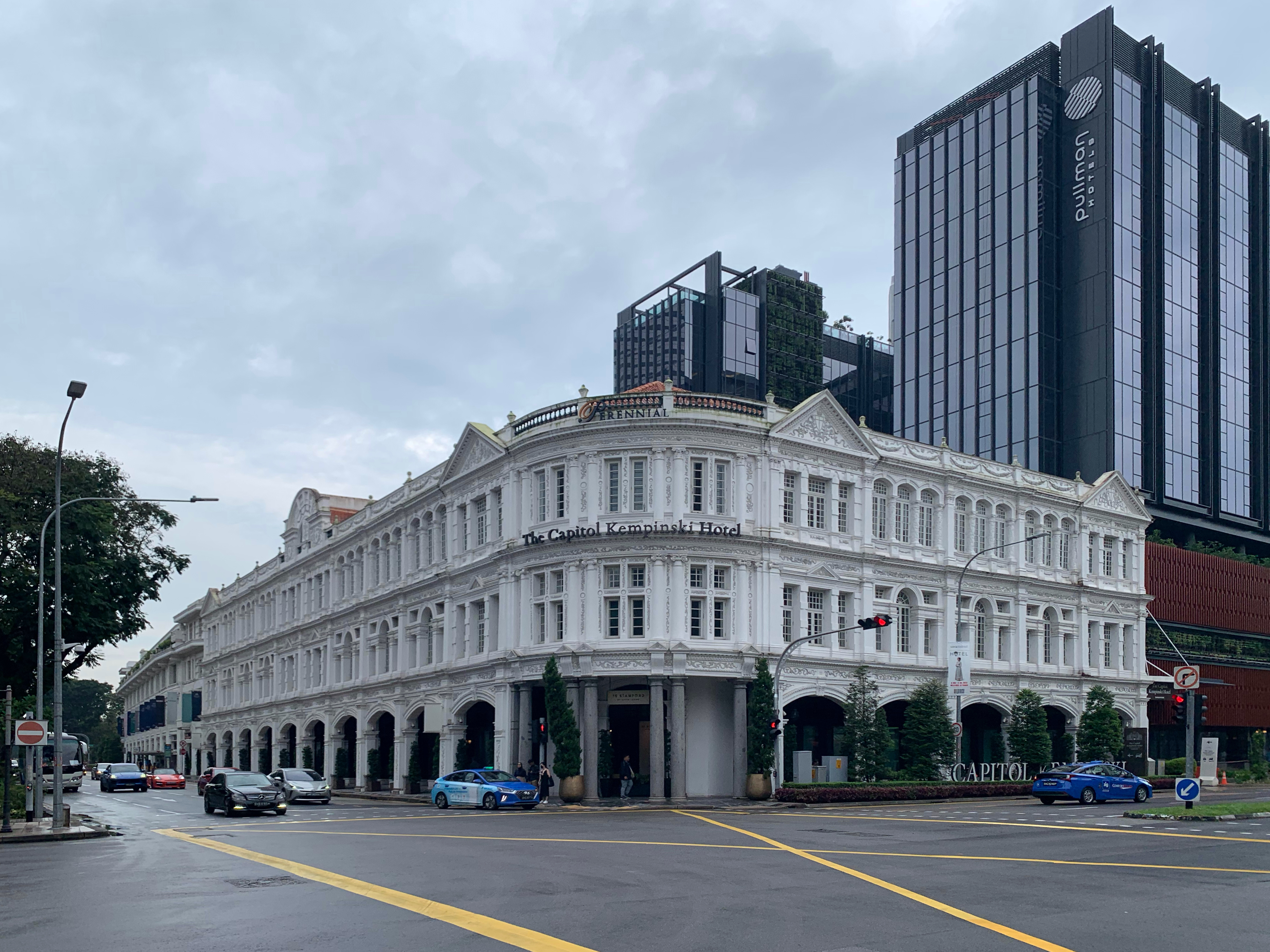
Stamford House in 2023

The constituency was formed from parts of City Constituency and Rochore Constituency. It covered parts of the historical City of Singapore and surrounding areas, including Stamford Road, Hill Street and portions of Bras Basah and Waterloo Street. The constituency was represented in the Legislative Assembly and later in Parliament following Singapore's independence in 1965. In 1976, the constituency was abolished as part of a wider electoral boundary review. Its electorate was divided, with roughly half absorbed back into Rochore Constituency and the remainder split between River Valley Constituency and Telok Ayer Constituency.

Several notable buildings and institutions were located within the boundaries of this constituency. These included the Old National Library Building at Stamford Road, which operated from 1960 until its closure in 2004, and the Stamford Arts Centre on Waterloo Street, which had functioned as a school before being repurposed for cultural use. The constituency also contained Stamford House, a commercial building constructed in 1904, and the former MPH Building, later known as the Vanguard Building, both of which are examples of early twentieth century architecture in Singapore. The area formed part of the historical civic and institutional core of the city and was characterised by a mixture of educational, religious and government facilities.

== Member of Parliament ==
| Year | Member of Parliament | Party |
Legislative Assembly of Singapore
| 1955 | J. M. Jumabhoy | LF |
| 1959 | Fung Yin Ching | PAP |
| 1963 | Fong Sip Chee | PAP |
Parliament of Singapore
| 1968 | Fong Sip Chee | PAP |
| 1972 | Fong Sip Chee | PAP |

== Electoral results ==
Note: The Elections Department does not include rejected votes when calculating the vote shares of candidates. Hence, all candidates' vote shares will total to 100% at any given election (may not appear so in multi-way contests due to rounding).

=== Elections in 1950s ===
General Election 1955: Stamford
| Party | Candidate | Votes | % | ±% |
|---|---|---|---|---|
| LF | J. M. Jumabhoy | 2,691 | 43.08 | |
| Independent | T. A. Simon | 1,281 | 20.51 | |
| PP | N. A. Mallal | 1,153 | 18.46 | |
| Democratic Party | Ng Sen Choy | 1,121 | 17.95 | |
| Turnout | | 13,207 | | |
| LF win (new seat) | | | | |

General Election 1959: Stamford
| Party | Candidate | Votes | % | ±% |
|---|---|---|---|---|
| PAP | Fung Yin Ching | 5,372 | 49.18 | |
| SPA | J. M. Jumabhoy | 3,810 | 34.88 | |
| WP | Ang Meng Gee | 925 | 8.47 | |
| LSP | Hooi Beng Guan | 679 | 6.22 | |
| Independent | Wong Chee Lim | 136 | 1.25 | |
| Turnout | | 12,392 | | |
| PAP gain from LF | | Swing | N/A | |

=== Elections in 1960s ===
General Election 1968
| Party | Candidate | Votes | % | ±% |
|---|---|---|---|---|
| PAP | Fong Sip Chee | Unopposed | | |
| Registered electors | | 9,919 | | |
| PAP hold | | Swing | N/A | |
