= Fort Canning Tunnel =

Tunnel in Singapore

Coordinates: 1°17′51″N 103°50′47″E

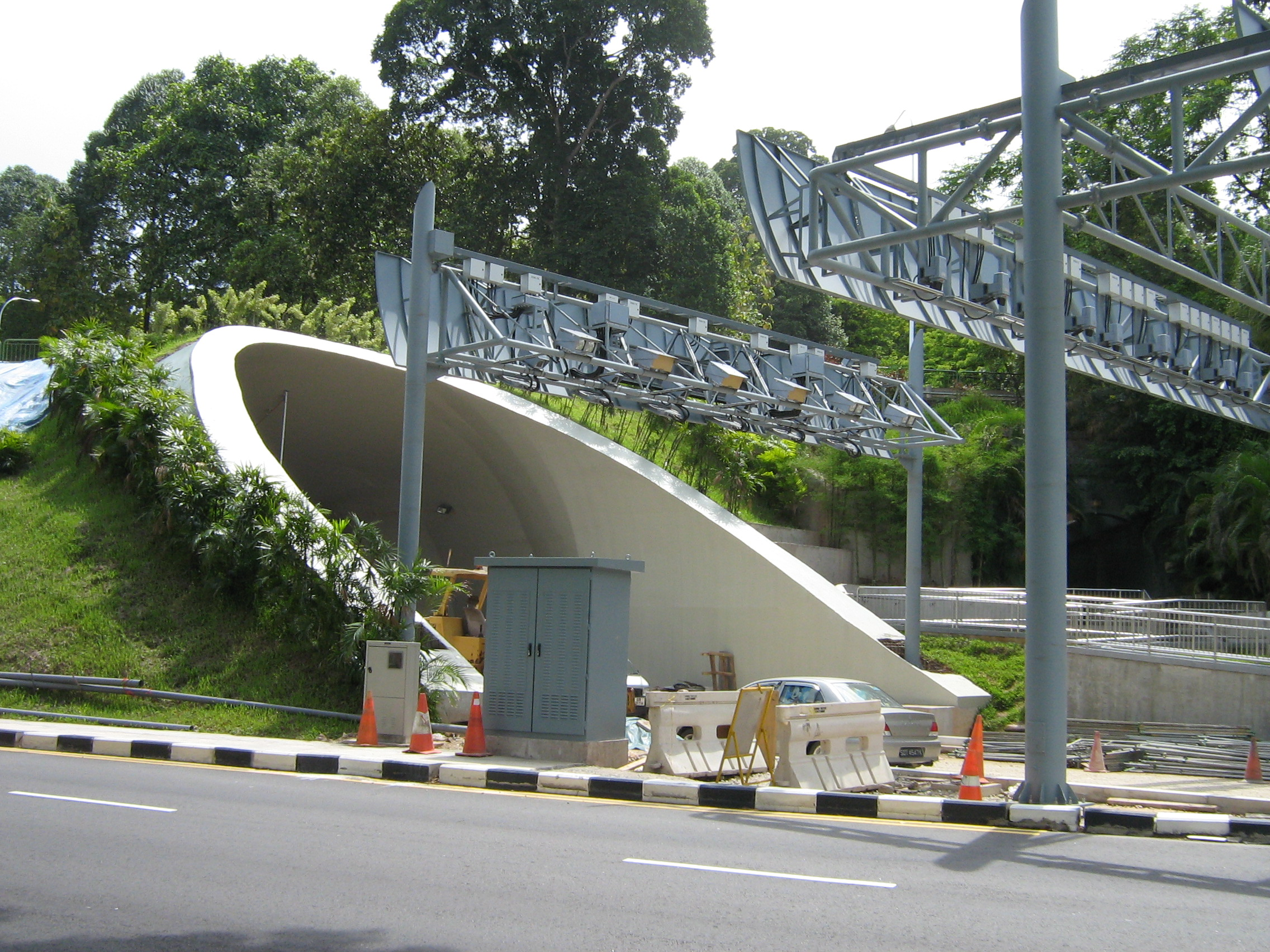
Fort Canning Tunnel close to completion in November 2006

Fort Canning Tunnel (Chinese: 福康宁隧道; pinyin: Fúkāngníng Suìdào), abbreviated as FCT, is a vehicular tunnel in the Central Area of Singapore.

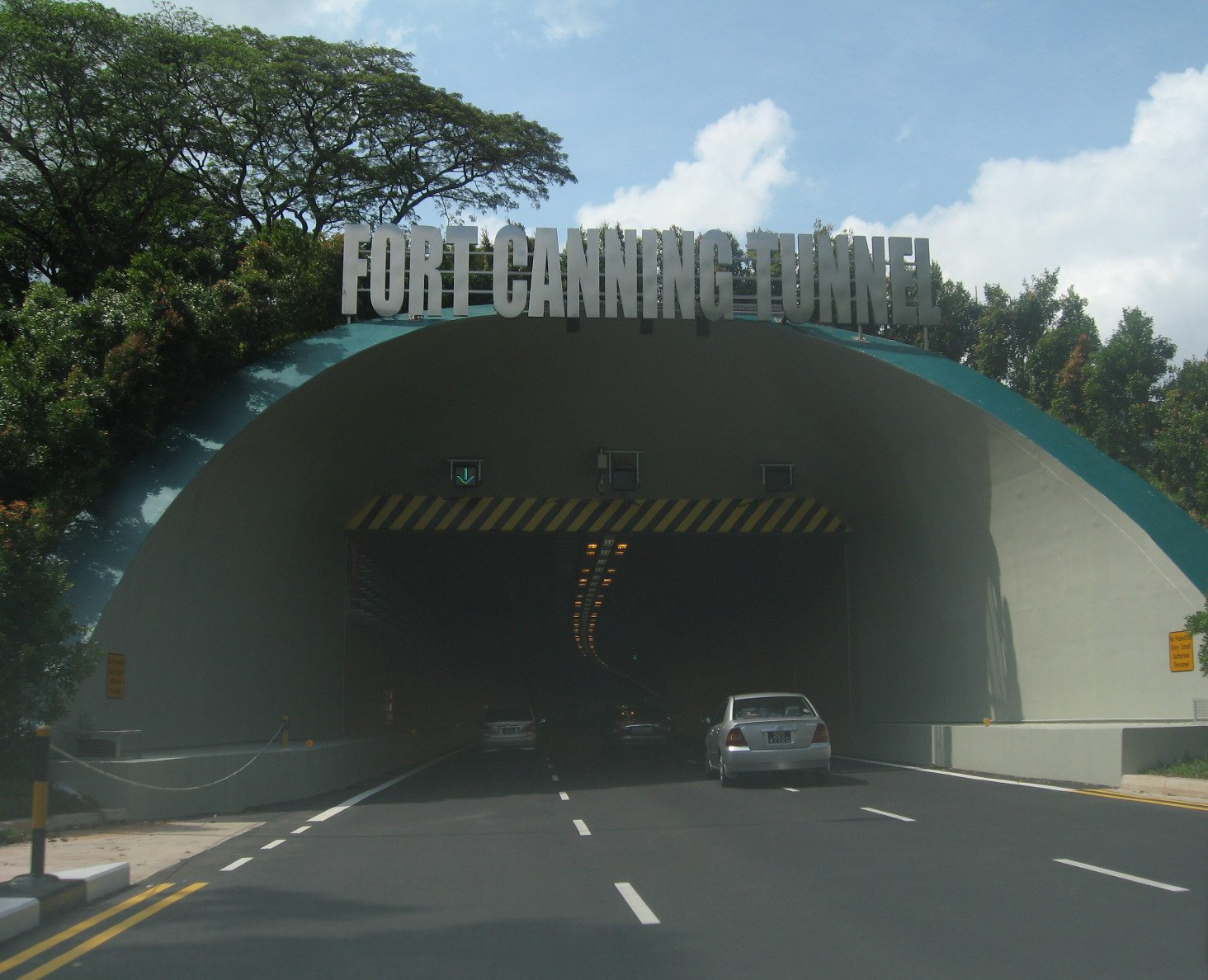
Fort Canning Tunnel

Besides the utilisation of relatively new engineering techniques, special care was taken to minimise impact on the environment of the surrounding Fort Canning during construction. The original contract for the FCT project was awarded to Sato Kogyo for S$25.95 million.

The FCT was one of four Technical Tours organised by the Land Transport Authority and Association of Consulting Engineers on 29 September 2006 during the World Roads Conference 2006 held in Singapore.

== Description ==
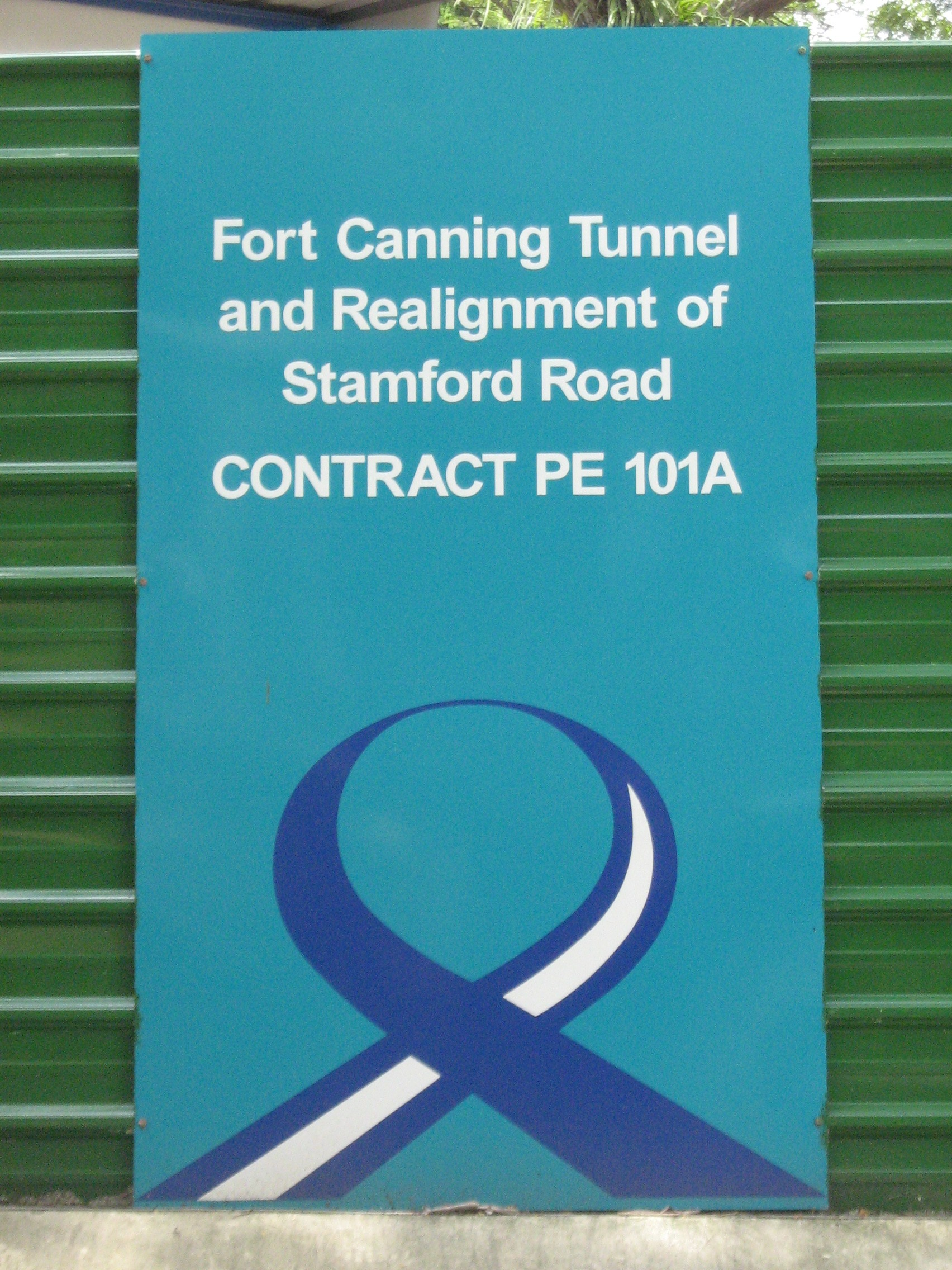
A signboard with the FCT's contract information

=== Location ===
The FCT cuts under Fort Canning Park and an access road, Canning Rise. The entrance to the tunnel is roughly located on the land which housed the Old National Library Building, at the junction of Stamford Road, Armenian Street and Queen Street. It brings traffic to Penang Road, providing direct access to the Orchard area. The stretch of Stamford Road between Queen Street and Bencoolen Street will also be permanently realigned in front of the National Museum of Singapore after the FCT's construction. The bedrock of the area was the so-called Fort Canning Boulder Bed, a stiff clay with huge embedded boulders.

=== Features ===
The tunnel is part of a 500 meter uni-directional three-lane new road. The FCT itself has a length of 350 meters. The FCT incorporates electrical cables to ensure continued mobile phone and radio coverage. Furthermore, ventilation jets were installed in case of traffic congestion or fire. The tunnel has no fire exits, due to its relatively short length. National Fire Protection Association standards require emergency escapes in tunnels every 300 meters. Four closed-circuit TV cameras are installed, two of which are inside the tunnel.

== Rationale ==
The FCT project was based on the Urban Redevelopment Authority's plans for the Museum Planning Area. Over 3,000 vehicles pass through Stamford Road every hour during peak periods. With the old traffic scheme, motorists stopped at two traffic lights at slow speeds, which made the area prone to congestion. In view of increased traffic from new developments in Marina Centre and Marina South to the Orchard shopping area, design plans for the tunnel were drawn up to allow motorists to bypass several traffic junctions. The tunnel cuts journey times from five minutes to as fast as eighteen seconds.

The construction of the FCT would form a grid pattern, resulting in more efficient land use for the adjacent Singapore Management University (SMU) campus. The realignment of Stamford Road would also make the journey to Bras Basah and Little India smoother. By cutting through Fort Canning Hill, the historical and environmental significance of the area would still be preserved.

== Construction ==
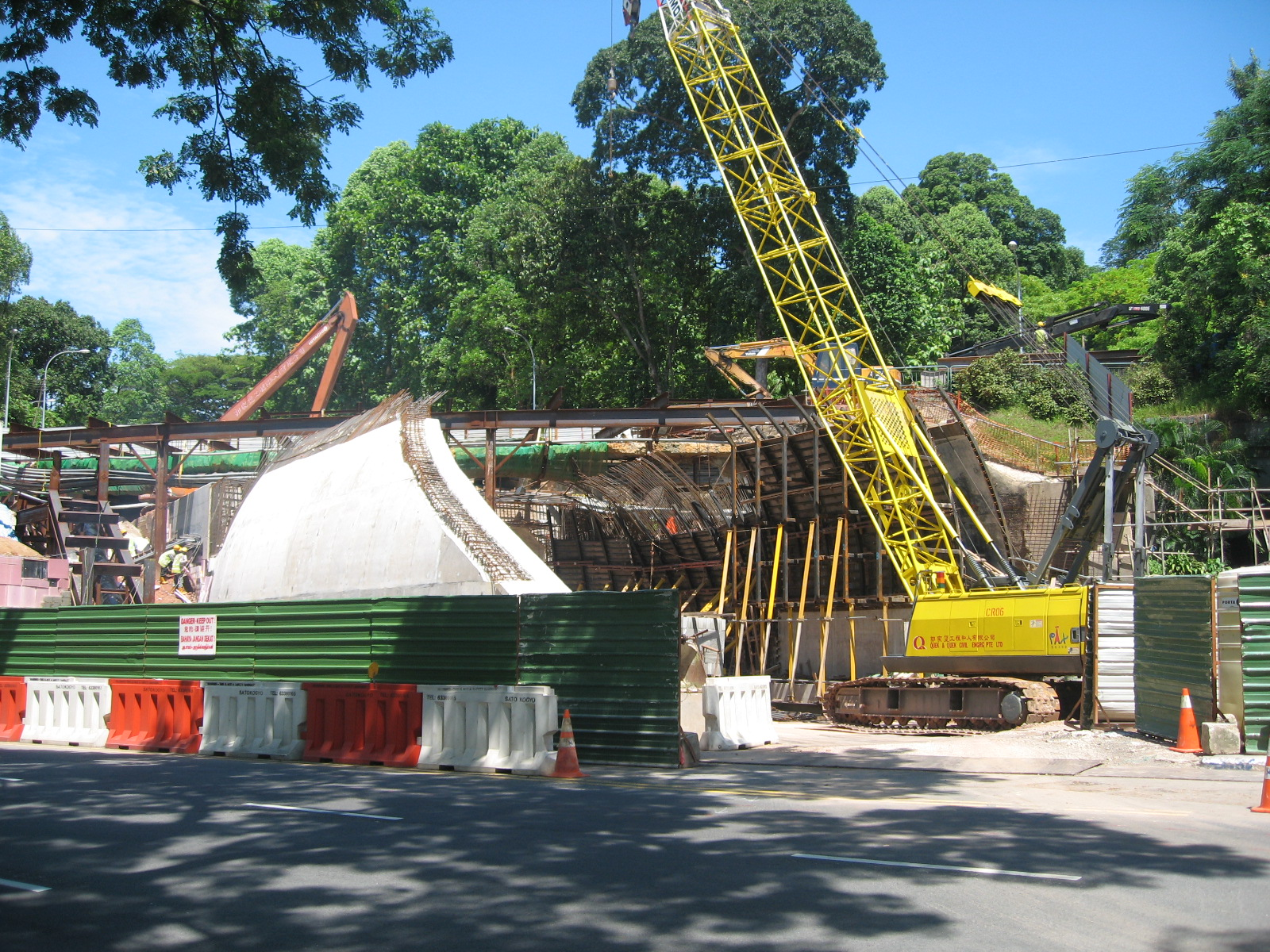
Fort Canning Tunnel under construction in May 2006

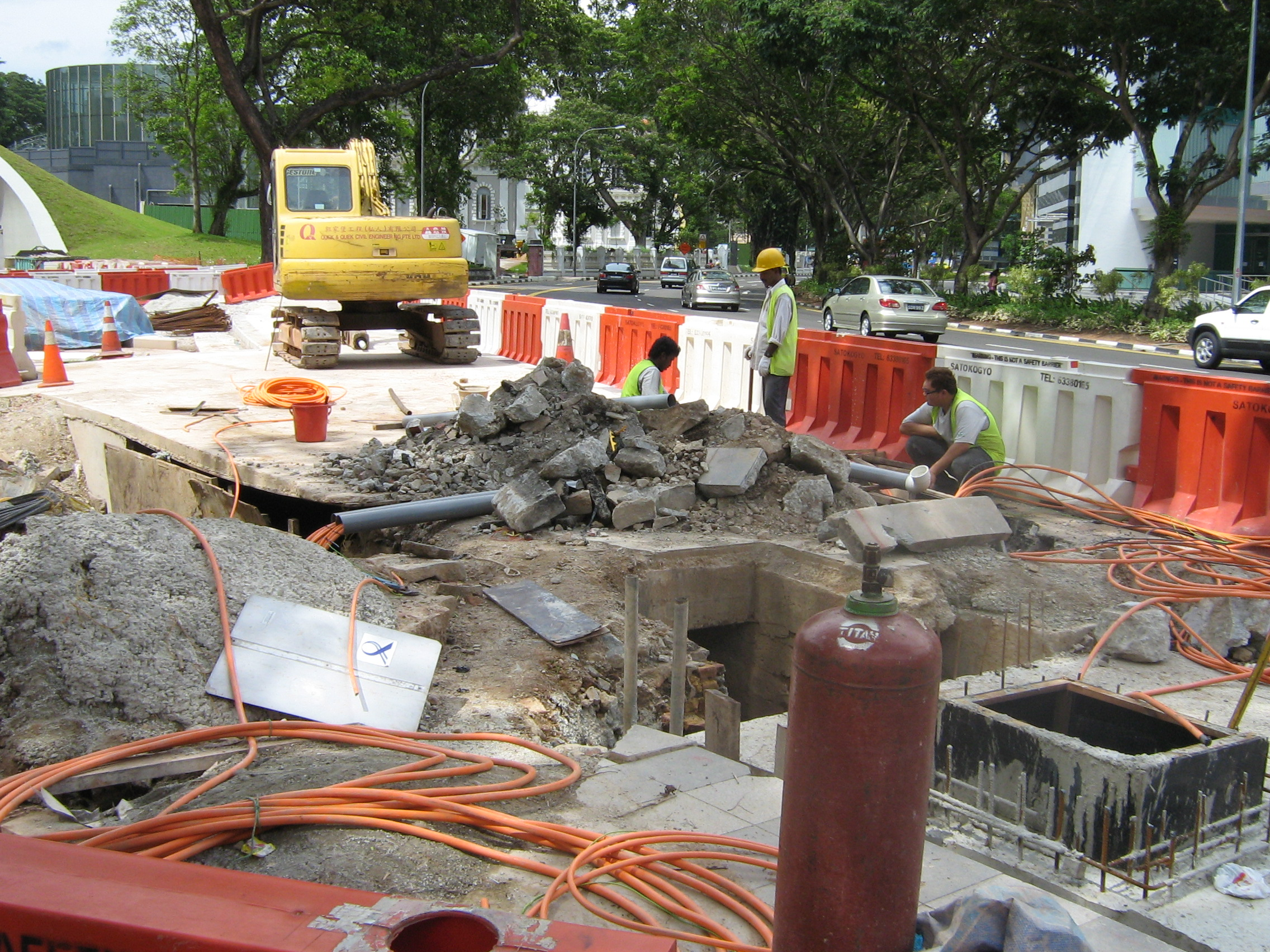
Workers fixing piping at the tunnel entrance

Construction of the FCT started in October 2003 and the tunnel was opened on 16 January 2007, despite original plans for completion by the end of 2006. The cost of the project was originally set at S$25.95 million, but this increased to S$34 million and eventually up to S$40 million. The tunnel was opened on 16 January 2007 at 6 a.m. SST.

=== Facilitating construction ===
To make way for the construction process, the old National Library was demolished and moved to its present location along Victoria Street. Sections of Canning Rise were closed twice during the course of construction. First, a stretch of road was closed for three months from 1 July 2004. After this, a different section was closed "to facilitate the reinstatement works" of the FCT from 25 April 2006 for a period of two months. However, this second closure was extended to 31 August. In addition, a section of Stamford Road was temporarily redirected through the SMU campus near Prinsep Street during construction before its final realignment in front of the National Museum.

Their two bus stops were relocated. The diversion of Stamford Road had to relocate the bus stop nearer to the school (SMU), instead of near to National Museum of Singapore. This bus stop retains the CBD 1994-style bus stop pole look and the name was renamed from "National Library" to "Singapore History Museum", before changing it to "SMU". In 2002, the bus stop pole was expanded.

In order not to conflict fast-moving traffic, the bus stop was moved to another side (Dhoby Ghaut MRT Station). It also retains the CBD 1994-style bus stop pole look.

=== Construction method ===
180 meters of the tunnel was constructed using an engineering technique known as the New Austrian Tunnelling method (NATM), which is similar to mining. The construction team used overlapping steel pipe roofs as support, with shotcrete lining, thick temporary invert, two layers of mesh, lattice girders and a watertight PVC membrane. The FCT is the first Singaporean road tunnel to use NATM, which has saved at least 22 trees in Fort Canning Park, including a 50-year-old tree. None of the designated 'Heritage Trees' were impacted by the FCT project. The remainder of the tunnel was constructed with the cheaper and more traditional cut-and-cover method.

A professional arboriculture company, Arborculture, was employed to assess the risk to flora in the area, as well as provide conservation and management strategies.
