= L. M. Harrod =

British librarian and indexer

Leonard Montague Harrod (21 May 1905 – 12 March 1984) was a British librarian and indexer. He was the librarian and the director of the Raffles Library in Singapore, and the Chief Librarian and Curator of Islington Public Libraries.

== Early life and education ==
Harrod was born in Horsham, England on 21 May 1905. He attended the Rutlish School in London and the School of Librarianship in University College London.

== Career ==
He was on the library staff of Wimbledon Public Library from 1923 to 1924, Fulham Library from 1924 to 1926 and Croydon Central Library from 1926 to 1937. From 1937 to 1940, he served as the Borough Librarian of Mitcham Public Library. From 1940 to 1954, he served as the Chief Librarian and Curator of Islington Public Libraries.

Harrod arrived in Singapore in September 1954 and was appointed the librarian of Raffles Library, and was appointed director the following year. He introduced the Browne Issue System and the usage of a combined receipt for subscriptions and deposits to the library. He purchased nearly 14,000 Chinese-language reference books for $13,600 to balance the representation of Chinese subjects and Chinese literature and initiated a project to translate various English-language children's books into other languages, such as Chinese, Malay and Tamil. He and an architect from the Public Works Department of Singapore designed the National Library Building on Stamford Road. In 1958, he was appointed the Singapore correspondent of the Society of Indexers. He retired from his position as the director of the library in January 1960.

Harrod served as the librarian of John Laing R & D from 1960 to 1961 and the City of Westminster College in 1961. From 1961 to 1969, he served as the Lecturer-in-Charge of Librarians at Northwestern Polytechnic. He served as the editor of The Indexer from 1964 to 1978, contributing editorials, book reviews, letters and annotations. He was the director of the indexing training courses organised by the Society of Indexers, and served as the society's representative on various committees of the British Standards Institution. In 1973, he was awarded the society's Wheatley Award for his index to The History of the King's works. Vol.6, 1782-1851. He served as the society's vice-chairman from 1974 to 1976 and served as a vice-president in 1978. In 1982, he was awarded the society's Carey Award.

== Personal life and death ==
Harrod married his wife, Jean, in 1932, and they had two children and four grandchildren. He achieved the Licentiate of the Royal Academy of Music on the violin.

He died on 12 March 1984.

== Bibliography ==
- The Librarians' Glossary of Terms Used in Librarianship, Documentation, and the Book Crafts, and Reference Book (1938)
- The Libraries of Greater London (1951)
- Books for Young People, Group III: Fourteen to Seventeen (1957)
- Library Work with Children (1969)
- Indexers on Indexing: A Selection of Articles Published in The Indexer (1978)
