= Old National Library Building =

Demolished library building in Singapore

Former National Library Building
- A commemorative postcard of the old National Library building at 91 Stamford Road, Singapore, c. 2004.
- 1°17′44.3″N 103°50′56.4″E
- Location: 91 Stamford Road, Singapore 178896, Singapore
- Type: National library
- Established: 12 November 1960; 65 years ago
- Dissolved: 31 March 2004; 22 years ago
- Architect: Public Works Department
- Branch of: National Library Board

Collection
- Size: 6,861,100 (2001)

Other information
- Public transit access: City Hall NS25 EW13; Dhoby Ghaut NS24 NE6 CC1

The former National Library Building was a library building at Stamford Road, located in the Museum Planning Area of Singapore, which housed the National Library. The library building was first suggested by Chinese philanthropist Lee Kong Chian in 1953, who wanted to establish a free multilingual public library; before this, most libraries were private. His suggestion was supported by the British government, and construction began the following year. The building was completed and officially opened in 1960 as the Raffles National Library, taking its name from the Raffles Library which it succeeded, and became a national icon for many Singaporeans.

Known for its red-brick exterior, the library would operate for over four decades, during which many advancements were made to improve its services such as creating mobile and branch libraries. The building additionally housed a reference library, a microfilm reading room, a lecture hall, and stacks for storage purposes. The library's first Singaporean director, Hedwig Anuar, helped with popularising the library among the youth and managing it from 1960 to 1988. Near its final years in 2001, the library's collection would peak at 6,861,100 books.

In the late 1980s, plans were announced in Parliament of the construction of a new National Library at Victoria Street. Despite a huge groundswell of public dissent, the library was closed on 31 March 2004 and was demolished later that year to make way for the construction of the Fort Canning Tunnel to ease road traffic to the city. The controversy surrounding the building's demise has been credited with sparking greater awareness of local cultural roots and an unprecedented wave in favour of heritage conservation among Singaporeans.

== Description ==
=== Site ===
The library was located at 91 Stamford Road, near Fort Canning Hill in Singapore's Museum Planning Area. It was formerly occupied by the St John Ambulance Headquarters and British Council Hall, which were demolished to make way for the library. The total floor area of the library was about 101,500 square feet (9,430 m^{2}). It was initially managed by the Ministry of Education from 1955 to 1959, the Ministry of Culture from 1959 to 1985, the Ministry of Community Development from 1985 to 1995, and finally by the National Library Board from 1995 onwards. It was accessible via City Hall or Dhoby Ghaut MRT station.

=== Architecture ===
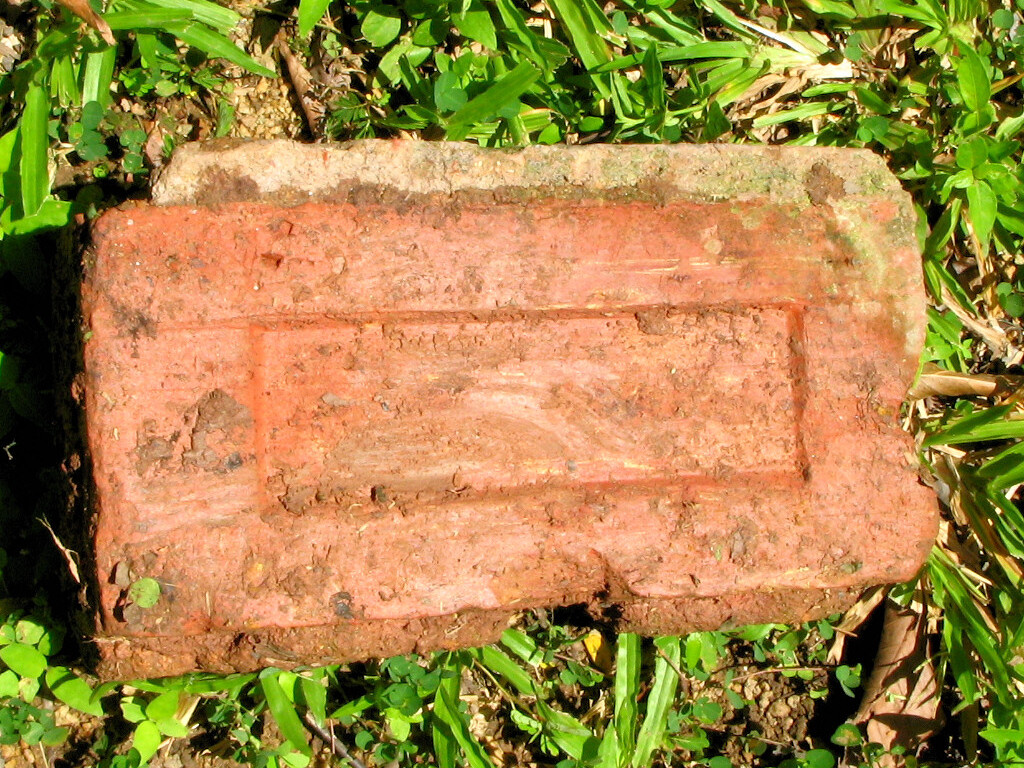
One of the red bricks of the building.

The library was designed by architects from the Public Works Department, with consultation from L. M. Harrod. It was made out of reinforced concrete and brick, with the exterior painted red and select bricks decorated by cement pointings. Its red-brick exterior was supposed to be reminiscent of British architecture in the early 1950s. Upon its opening, the building received criticism for its appearance, with architect William Lim Siew Wai stating that the building should appear as a monument of Singapore. Another architect, Ong Eng Han, said that it was "a jumble of architectural sections which [had] been lumped together to form a haphazard whole."

The building was two storeys tall, excluding the basement, and took a T-shaped form. The basement was used as a storage room, a workshop to repair mobile libraries, an area to catalogue and process books, and held the air-conditioning plant, which served the offices, lecture hall, mezzanine, and the library's stack building. (Note: Initial plans were to have the entire building be air-conditioned, but it was reduced to specific rooms to save money.) The first floor had the exhibition hall, libraries for adults and children, a Braille library for the blind, an activities room for children which held puppet shows, a lecture hall, and work departments. The lecture hall had space for around 200 people and could be hired out for lectures, films, or other meeting purposes. It consisted of a stage and projector with its own entrance separate to the building so that it could be accessed even when the library was closed. The mezzanine had offices and training rooms for library staff.

The second floor had a reference library, study area, microfilm reading room, conference room, and reading room, the latter of which was typically used by secondary school students for studying. The conference room could seat about 50 people and, much like the lecture hall, was hired out for local use. Furthermore, a five-storey building was erected nearby to help store books and archive government documents, serving as the library's stack. It was designed in such a way that it could be expanded exponentially to help store future items. Although the stacks were not directly accessible to the public, a book lift was incorporated for readers. The five-storey stack building also received air-conditioning.

A commemorative postcard showing the library's cafe (background) and fountain, c. 2004.

In the centre, there was a small open air courtyard which was occupied by a fountain and cafe, known as the Coffee Club Xpress cafe. The courtyard was mainly used as a recreational area, holding multiple weekly events. These weekly programmes, which were launched in June 1998, were hosted to both bring non-readers to the library and serve as an area for people to express themselves. Known as Xpressions @ the Courtyard, it featured presentations on feng shui, business, Cantonese opera, Indian dance, music, film-making, and poetry, which typically brought around 115 people per session.

=== Facilities ===
Two years after its opening in 1960, the library was estimated to be able to hold around 250,000 books, with space for further expansion. By 1995, its collection grew to 407,794 books – 74% were in English, 15% in Chinese, 8% in Malay, and 3% in Tamil. It would gain access to a further 21 million books in Chinese in 1997 following an agreement between the National Library Board and the National Library of China. Additionally, the library had 4,000 volumes of music, 200 books in Braille, and 1,000 microfilms. The library also maintained subscriptions with around 400 periodicals and 500 annuals. By 2001, the library had accumulated a collection of 6,861,100 books. It also served as the headquarters for Singapore's public library services, along with holding documents from the State Archives and local publications under the Printers' and Publishers' Ordinance.

The library could seat different amounts of people per area, with space for 100 in the adult library, 100 in the children's library, and 200 in the reference library. However, the library would receive frequent complaints on the lack of accommodation, particularly during peak hours or examination periods, with students taking up most of the seats during the latter. The library's book shelves were made with balau timber that were further graded and painted using insecticide solution to help maintain the books. Dark red meranti timber was used in making the furniture, which itself was made by the Singapore Prisons Department. The stacks were made with steel. In 1964, the library was expanded with a Southeast Asia Room, which included archives, journals, newspapers, and photographs relating to the region. This collection, known as the Ya Yin Kwan collection, comprised around 10,000 items that were donated to the library by Malaysian businessman Tan Yeok Seng and was officially opened by culture minister S. Rajaratnam.

In 1979, the National Library spent S$1.2 million buying its first computers, which were taken from the Ministry of Finance's Computer Services Department. This was part of an effort to computerise the library and its branches in three stages. In 1983, audio-visual equipment was purchased to allow audio-visual materials such as filmstrips, videotapes, slides, and cassettes to be viewed or listened to. The rooms containing the equipment could seat around 12 people. Moreover, the library launched a borrowing service for audio-visual materials. In 1988, the library temporarily stopped readers from borrowing books for the purpose of cataloguing its entire collection into a computer database, which subsequently allowed readers to identify the book they were looking for via computer terminals in the library. In 1995, National Library, alongside other libraries in Singapore, added terminals for reader's use which allowed free access to the internet at those locations. The National Library had three – two in the reference library and one in the loan section. They could be used to renew books, search through the library's catalogue, and ask questions.

External images
- The refurbished interior of the National Library, via National Library Board
- The self-borrowing stations in the library, via National Library Board

After the library's renovation in 1998, more services and rooms were added such as a student resource room, heritage room, current affairs room, Singapore-related resources room, and computer room. The floor was carpeted and the office area was converted into a larger, public space. This was to add more open spaces in the building, which was further increased by the creation of a lobby and courtyard, which totalled to an additional 4,000 square feet (370 m^{2}) being added. The library also began adapting to the IT age, as seen with its addition of a computer room that had 38 computers that could search on over 200 databases. Older books that were worn out were also removed and replaced with 60,000 newer books. This renovation saw the library's visitorship increase from 30,000 to 187,000 monthly.

== History ==
=== Background ===
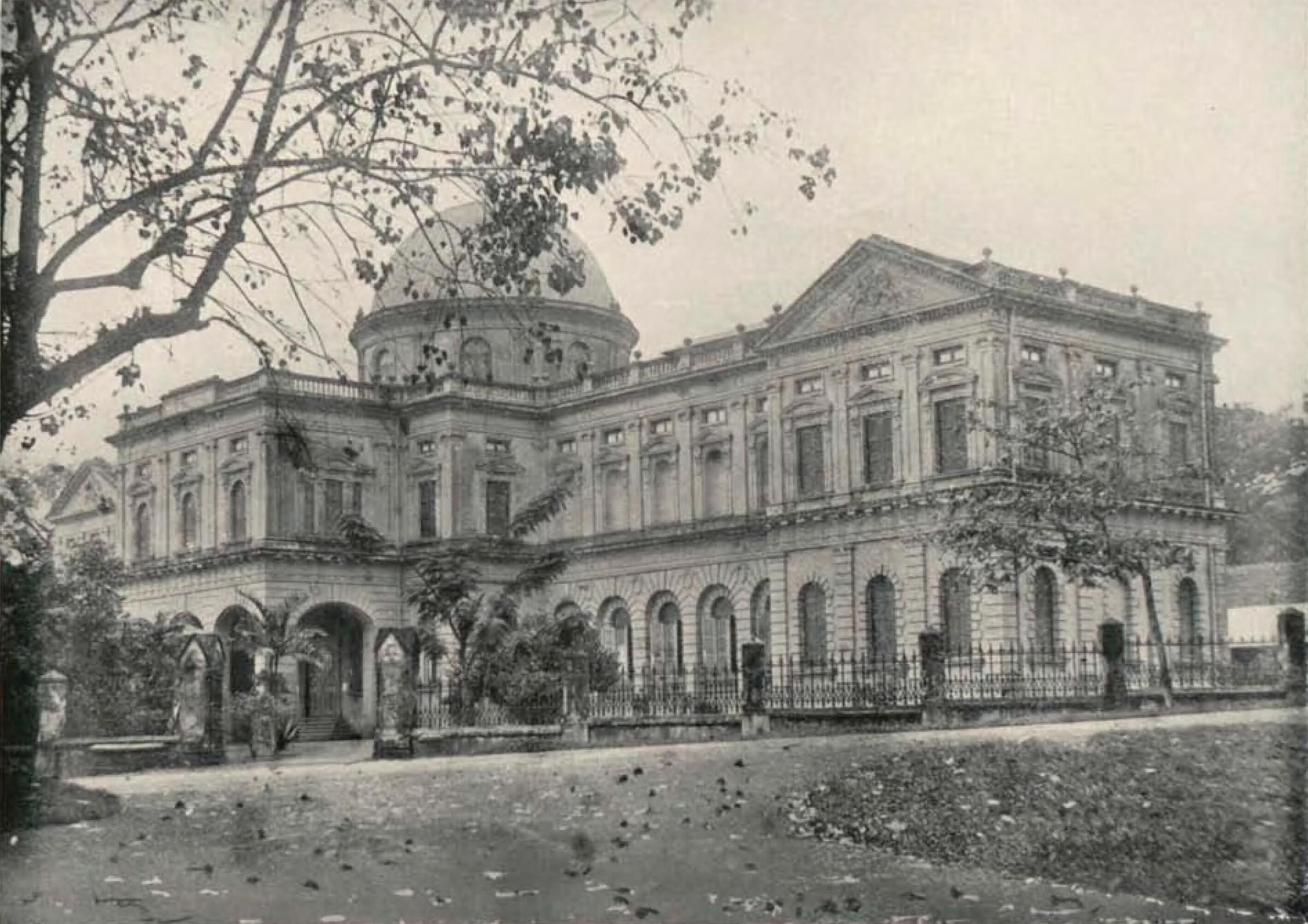
The Raffles Library, 1908

One of the earliest libraries in Singapore was established at the Singapore Free School in 1837. The school's library was small, being expanded in 1844 by residents into the Singapore Library. The Singapore Library used subscriptions as its main source of income, inevitably facing frequent financial difficulties. In 1874, the Singapore Library would merge to form the Raffles Library, in return that the government would take over their debt and that the founders be given lifetime access to the new library.

Despite being called a public library, the Raffles Library was subscription-based and only had 349 members in 1899. In addition, its users were mainly Europeans and was stated to have been "generally less than welcoming" towards non-Europeans. Although there was a free reading room where non-members could request books, it was also used sparingly, only receiving 4,000 visitors in 1878 or about 1.7% of Singapore's population at the time. The library also contained mostly English-language books, a language which only a minority of the Singaporean population could read.

The earliest suggestion of a change to the Raffles Library's policies was in 1940, when library director Frederick Chasen wrote a letter to the library's committee suggesting that they "do something for the mass of Singapore's people". However, Chasen did acknowledge that the "poorer class [would] be practically dead weight financially" and would "swamp the more fastidious element among the subscribers." Following World War II, the library would be left unaffected, but anti-colonial and pro-independence sentiments grew amongst Singaporeans. This led to Singapore being granted slight internal governance in the 1950s.

=== Construction ===
As the Colony of Singapore's politics changed, other aspects such as education also changed. In 1953, Chinese community leader and philanthropist Lee Kong Chian offered S$375,000 towards the creation of a free public library in Singapore, on the conditions that vernacular languages were promoted and encouraged to the public. (Note: Lee had previously discussed the creation of a public library in May 1952, and was met with positive approval.) The British government was quick to accept the offer, contributing S$625,000 to make up the S$1 million to be spent on the construction of the library. The construction of the library officially began in September 1954; it was supposed to begin earlier in the year, but priority was instead given on the construction of the Teacher's Training College. The chosen site for the library was at the foot of Fort Canning Hill along Stamford Road, and required demolishing the St John Ambulance Headquarters and the British Council Hall to make way for the new library. Raffles Library's librarian L. M. Harrod consulted with a Singaporean architect for the building's design.

In 1955, the plans were updated to include space for a travelling library, workshops, a Braille library, offices, and air-conditioning in certain rooms. (Note: Air-conditioning was needed as books at Raffles Library were "rotting" due to Singapore's humidity.) The building's frame would be made of reinforced concrete and feature a red-brick exterior, along with fluorescent lighting being used to light the building. L. Bintley, acting Chief Architect of the Public Works Department, suggested that the new library design would be able to hold up to 100,000 books on the open shelves with a further 380,000 in storage rooms. However, this new design would cost S$2 million, leading to its construction being delayed during the 1956 Budget. In 1956, the Ministry of Education stated that the library would be named the Raffles National Library, after the original Raffles Library. (Note: Responsibility of the Raffles Museum and Raffles Library were given to the Ministry of Education following the 1955 general elections.)

Construction restarted in 1957, with Lee laying the foundation stone of the building in August of that year. The library, which was expected to take two years to build, had an increased cost of S$2.5 million with the addition of a five-storey storage building that was planned to hold books and documents of both the library and the government. A bill was also passed at the Legislative Assembly that made the library's use free for all. The bill – the Raffles National Library Ordinance – took action on 1 April 1958 and replaced the Raffles Societies Ordinance. In 1959, following the People's Action Party's landslide victory at the general elections, a new government was formed and responsibility of the library was moved from the Ministry of Education to the Ministry of Culture. That same year, culture minister S. Rajaratnam stated that the library's book collection would be reorganised and expanded to include more non-English language books. Malay-language books were imported from Indonesia while children's books were translated to the four main languages of Singapore.

=== Opening and subsequent developments ===
External images
- Guests at the National Library at its opening, via National Library Board
- Yang di-Pertuan Negara Yusof Ishak speaking at the opening of the National Library, via National Library Board

The library was officially opened on 12 November 1960 by Yang di-Pertuan Negara Yusof Ishak, at which it was well received. Around 3,000 people visited the library daily, an increase from the 1,000 received by the Raffles Library. The library had 150,000 books, of which 14,000 were Chinese books, 3,300 were Malay and Indonesian books, and 3,700 were Tamil books. There was also an additional 177 Braille books and 4,000 volumes of music. The books were transferred from Raffles Library to the new library using lorries as part of the first phase of Operation Pinda; the second phase required the staff to arrange them onto the shelves. That same year, the word "Raffles" was dropped from "Raffles National Library" and "Raffles National Museum", becoming known as the "National Library" and "National Museum", respectively. This was done in two bills to better depict the buildings as "a symbol of national loyalty and aspiration", according to Rajaratnam. It was passed in December.

Hedwig Anuar was appointed the first Singaporean director of the National Library in April 1960 and served until June 1961. Under Anuar's leadership, with further years as assistant director from 1962 to 1964 and a continued directorship from 1965 to 1988, she helped to popularise the library with the public. In 1960, she launched two programmes relating to the library, Our Library, a magazine about recent happenings that was broadcast on Radio Singapore, and Off the Shelf, a documentary about the mobile library service that was shown at local cinemas. Anuar also managed to attract a young generation by launching the Young Adult Service, a collection of books targeted towards young people. This service would prove to be successful as the new collection would always be more than half empty and lead to an increase of 400 registrations a month.

In the early years of the National Library, it suffered from a lack of proper staff; Harrod wrote in his final report that the library needed at least eleven full-time, professionally trained staff to manage it. At that time, there was only one full-time employee, himself, and one part-time employee. Furthermore, until 1957, the library staff could not write Chinese characters nor properly catalogue the books. This eventually came to the attention of the Singaporean government, which, using funds from the Colombo Plan, appointed two foreign experts – John Cole and Priscilla Taylor – to help manage the library. Cole and Taylor were appointed the director and associate director of the National Library, respectively.

Cole, much like Harrod, agreed that the main issue was the lack of qualified staff. In response, the government started giving scholarships to employees at the library to study overseas in New Zealand and the United Kingdom. This helped in bringing the number of trained staff up to sixteen by 1963. However, the library would continue to struggle with an increased workload as the number of users grew exponentially, even with the number of staff increasing alongside it. (Note: In an attempt to help reduce the number of people joining, the library set up a S$5.00 deposit for memberships in 1964.) In a 1965 board meeting, with thirty-six staff working at the library, it was stated that "the capacity of the staff was [...] being strained to its limits". By 1968, the issue would resolve itself as the library staff and users reached a "rough equilibrium".

Another issue the library faced was financial difficulties. In the period between 1968 to 1971, the British would gradually withdraw their forces from Singapore, reducing Singapore's expenditure by an estimated S$900 million. With the British forces leaving, importance was placed on building up a new defence for Singapore, leading to other aspects such as education being neglected. During this period, the National Library struggled financially; its acquisitions budget had remained the same since 1964. In following the scheme of buying books in all four languages, the library's book budget was strained, on top of being reduced by over 30% to 40% over the past five years. This also led to manpower shortages, with the state of the library being deemed unsuitable for performing the role of the "National Library". Eventually, by the 1970s, library services would begin to be given proper financing following the country's economic success.

To help expand its collections, the library mainly relied on donations from the public. Some notable donations include 1,500 books by the Chinese Booksellers Association in 1960, books relating to careers by the Singapore Rotary Club in 1963, and a Carl Alexander Gibson-Hill collection about history, art, archaeology, zoology, and ornithology by Loke Cheng Kim in 1965. For the library's adult collection, they recruited specialists from the National University of Singapore, Singapore Polytechnic, and the Teacher's Training College; these efforts allowed the library to accumulate 6,861,100 books by 2001. The library also focused on its outreach, using both mobile libraries and creating more branches to offer its services in more rural areas. One of the National Library's first branches was in built in Queenstown in 1970. At the cost of S$646,900, it was opened as Queenstown Public Library.

From the 1960s to the 1980s, the library also served as a popular destination for studying and socialising for young people from neighbouring schools such as Raffles Institution, Raffles Girls' School, St Joseph's Institution, and Tao Nan School that had their early beginnings in this area. The landmark balustrade or front porch and steps leading up to the Library became an intimate public space.

In November 1980, the S$5.00 deposit cost for the library's membership would be waived to allow more people to become members. Originally, people above fourteen years old had to pay the deposit, but it was changed to only foreigners having to pay it. The library further offered Singaporean members with the option to be refunded their S$5.00 or to donate it to the library. This would lead to an increase of 8,900 free members to the library the following year. By 1984 however, the library struggled to get a full response from its members on whether they wanted their money refunded, leaving them with around S$620,000 that it was unable to use. The membership deposits were settled by 1985. That same year, the management of the National Library was given from the Ministry of Culture to the newly created Ministry of Community Development. Following the creation of the National Library Board (NLB) in 1995, the responsibility of Singapore's libraries was subsequently handed to them, including the National Library.

=== Civic and Cultural District Master Plan ===
A Civic and Cultural District Master Plan exhibition was held in 1988 by the Ministry of National Development (MND) to garner public feedback to develop the central area into a historical, cultural, and retail zone. This master plan was aimed to revitalise Singapore's civic and cultural hub, citing the location of key cultural institutions such as the Victoria Theatre and Concert Hall, the National Museum, as well as the National Library within the district.

On 28 May, MND minister S. Dhanabalan chaired a dialogue attended predominantly by invited professionals such as planners, architects, and property consultants to review the Master Plan exhibited a month earlier. During the professional dialogue, the Urban Redevelopment Authority's (URA) many micro-planning proposals were reviewed, including the proposed demolition of the National Library to create a "clear view of Fort Canning Hill from Bras Basah Park". No conclusive statement on the building's fate was made in the press report or in URA's publication, Skyline Vol. 37.

== Redevelopment ==
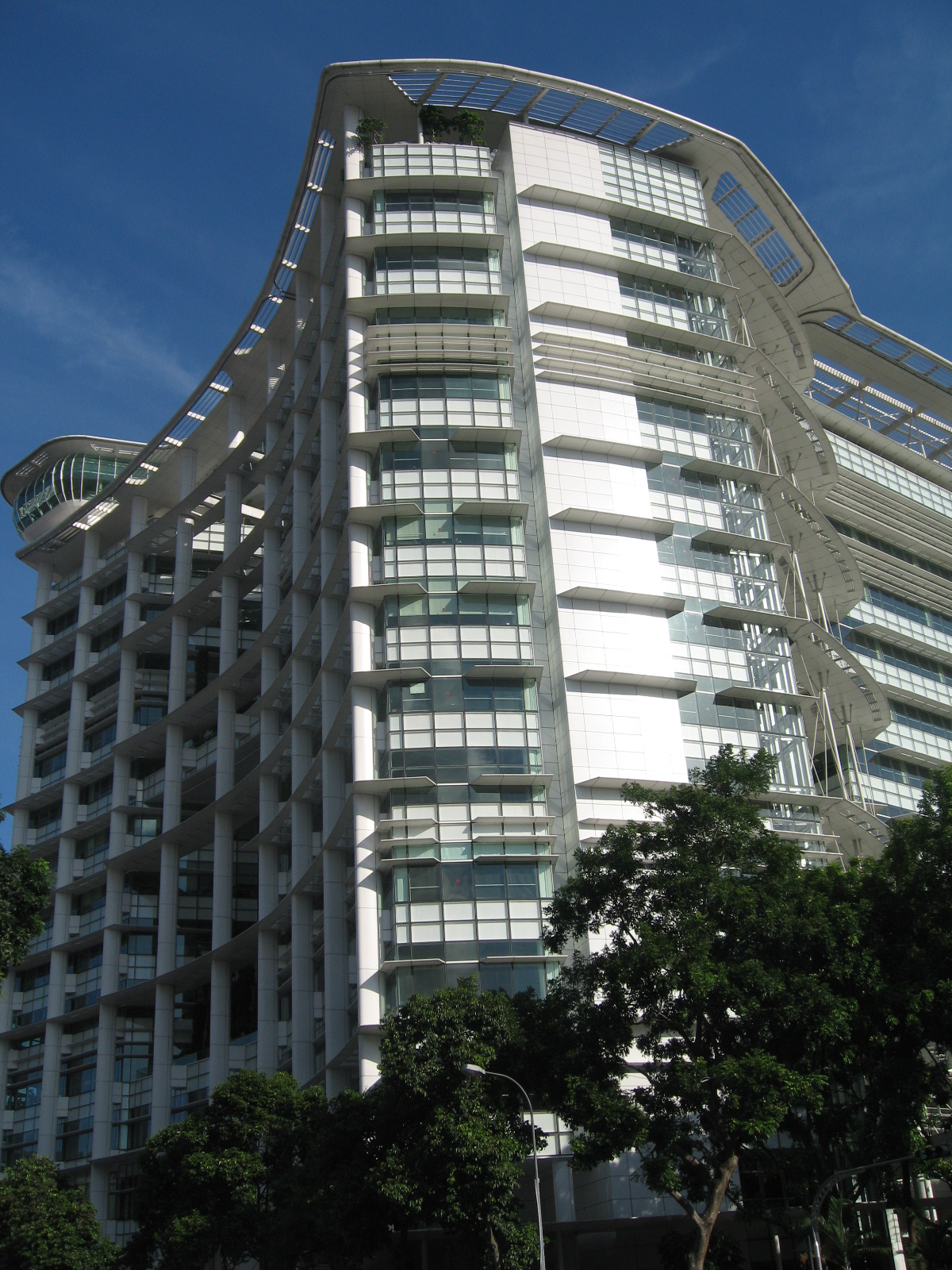
The new National Library at Victoria Street, 2006

In March 1989, minister of state for community development Seet Ai Mee revealed to Parliament the plans to build a new National Library at the junction of Stamford Road and Queen Street, which would be located diagonally opposite the existing National Library. Moreover, there were plans to build four new branches in Yishun, Tampines, Hougang, and Woodlands. This announcement generated extensive discussion in the ensuing months on the potential of a new National Library. On 17 March 1990, the Ministry of Community Development confirmed in Parliament that the new National Library would be erected at the former Raffles Girls' School site on Queen Street. A library consultant was appointed the following month to advise on the planning of the new building.

The 1992 Civic District Master Plan public exhibition was held from 22 to 26 February by the Urban Redevelopment Authority (URA). An important revision was the mentioning of the one-way Fort Canning Tunnel, entering the hill at the existing National Library and emerging at Penang Road, to be built by the year 2000. The URA explained that the 380 m (1,250 ft) long tunnel would help smooth the major traffic intersection in front of Cathay Building and direct heavy traffic away from the Marina to Orchard areas, thus giving the Museum precinct a "peaceful [and] quiet ambience".

Work on the tunnel was expected to start after the National Library was relocated to Victoria Street by 1996. In the extensive press reports in 1992, neither the demolition of the National Library building nor the reasons for changing the site of the new National Library to Victoria Street were given. In the subsequent 1997 Master Plan for the area, intentions for the Fort Canning Tunnel remained unchanged and it was not explicitly stated in the report that the National Library building would be demolished.

In April 1997, the library was closed for a S$2.6 million upgrading and renovation programme to meet the needs of the IT age by adding new computers and updating its collection with 80,000 volumes. It was planned to reopen on 1 October, but the renovations took nine months and the library was officially reopened on 16 January 1998. Its opening was officiated by minister of state for foreign affairs Ow Chin Hock. In this renovation, floors were carpeted, the exterior was given glass partitions, the Southeast Asia Room was replaced by the Singapore Research Centre, the lending library was renamed the Central Community Library, an information counter was added, and new shelves and study tables were introduced.

=== Public dissent ===
On 8 December 1998, a letter by Kelvin Wang to The Straits Times' forum page was published about the National Library. Wang brought to the public attention that there was a possibility that the National Library would be demolished, after a recent announcement by the newly formed Singapore Management University (SMU) that its new city campus would be sited in the Bras Basah area, which included the National Library's present site. Wang wrote:

Bras Basah has lost too many unique buildings already, and we should not lose the National Library because it would mean that Singaporeans will not only lose another part of their history, but also a part of what forms their collective memory, which helps make Singapore "home".

In response, the SMU assured the public that they could play a part in deciding the fate of the National Library building as it had not yet decided what to do with the building. On 13 March 1999, SMU organised a public symposium at the Singapore Art Museum to gather feedback for its campus masterplan. According to The Straits Times, the turnout was overwhelming, and the event was highly publicised, lasting over 4 hours. This was the first occasion where the URA made public their decision to demolish the National Library building. Furthermore, the Preservation of Monuments Board assessed that the building was not worthy of national monument status nor conservation.

From March to April 1999, there arose a huge groundswell of public dissent in the media over the National Library building's fate, as well as the drastic physical alterations of its environs. A number of featured columns by journalists touched on gradually disappearing heritage landmarks, as well as shared memories of Singaporeans. The National Library Board (NLB) also defended its decision to renovate the library in 1997 when it was announced it would be demolished only a few years later. The upgrades were to bring it "up to par with the other libraries", which was seen in its increase in visitorship after the renovation. In May, the NLB launched online questionnaires that allowed the public to express what they wanted in the new library building, along with elements of the old building that should be preserved in the new building's design. This came shortly after a suggestion that the library's steps and foyer could be replicated for the new building.

On 24 January 2000, after SMU chaired a technical workshop to obtain feedback on three alternative proposals, architect Tay Kheng Soon held a press conference at The Substation to unveil his unofficial SMU masterplan. His proposal entailed re-routing the tunnel to save the National Library building. A week later, Tay wrote to the Prime Minister's Office regarding his proposal which was referred to the MND. A number of people wrote in either in support of Tay's plans or arguing for heritage conservation in general. A few articles and letters highlighted that the adamant official response to public dissent ran counter to the spirit of the Government's S21 Vision, which expressed a desire to foster civic participation and active citizenry. On 7 March 2000, MND minister Mah Bow Tan announced in Parliament that the National Library building would have to be demolished. According to Mah, the authorities had assessed Tay's plans but concluded that the URA's plan was a better proposal for preserving the Civic District's ambience and being more people-friendly.

== Aftermath and legacy ==
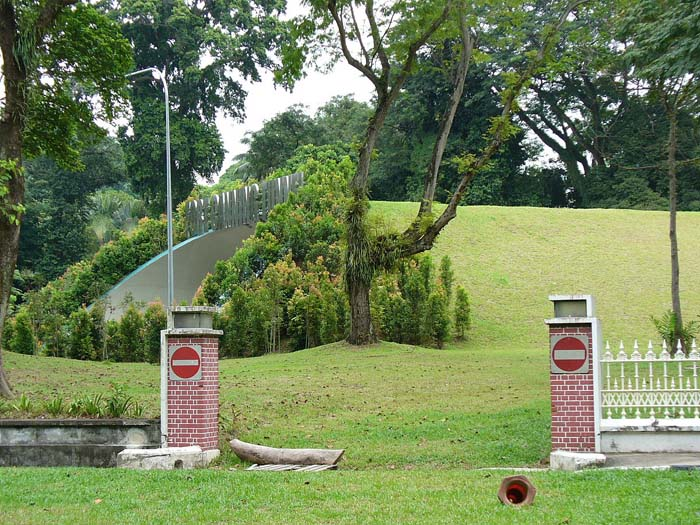
The red pillars of the old National Library in 2007, at its original site

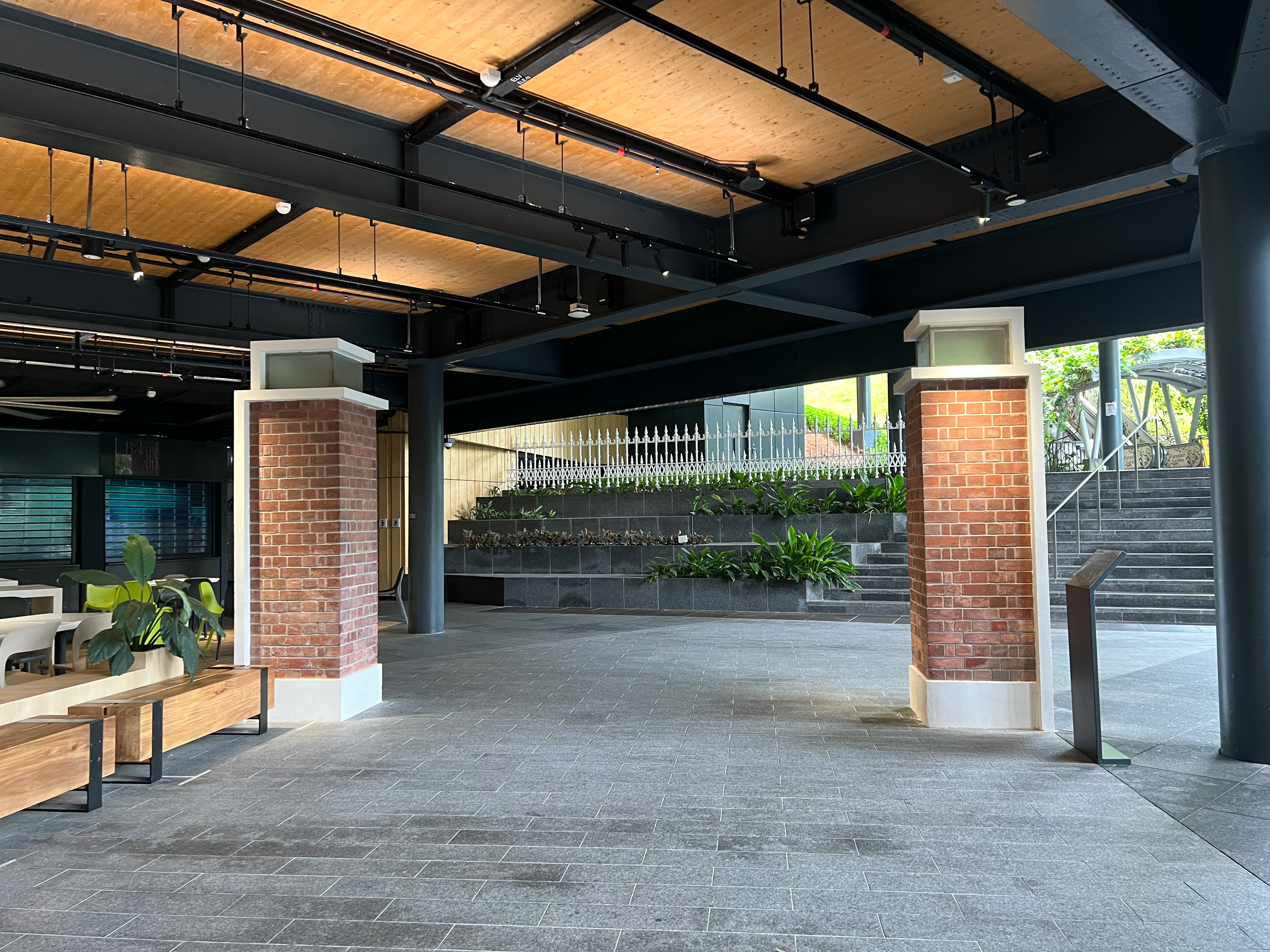
The pillars after being moved into SMU in 2022

The library continued to operate before officially closing on 31 March 2004. The old National Library building was eventually demolished during the construction of the Fort Canning Tunnel. It reopened on 12 November 2005 at Victoria Street. During the demolition, two red-bricked pillars and fence were left behind as a remembrance at its original site. In 2019, the Singapore Management University (SMU) started construction of a five-storey addition, the Tahir Foundation Connexion, to the SMU city campus and the pillars and fence were temporarily removed from its location. The pillars and fence were restored to their original location and integrated into the campus the following year.

Red bricks were also collected and used in a wall of a garden at the new National Library's Basement 1 Central Public Library. A pattern of a St Andrew's Cross located in the old library's self-borrowing stations was also moved to an area outside the entrance of the new library. In the years following its destruction, the building has remained a fond memory for many Singaporeans. The controversy surrounding the building's demise has also been credited for sparking greater awareness of local cultural roots and an unprecedented wave in favour of heritage conservation among Singaporeans. In 2023, Time Out included the building on a list of seven former Singapore landmarks. The old National Library building was also included in a mural of Singapore landmarks in City Hall MRT station as part of SMRT's Comic Connect.

== See also ==
- National Library, Singapore – the building's successor
- National Theatre, Singapore – a similar site that was also demolished to make way for a tunnel
