= Library@esplanade =

Defunct public library in Singapore

Coordinates: 1°17′22.9″N 103°51′21.9″E

library@esplanade
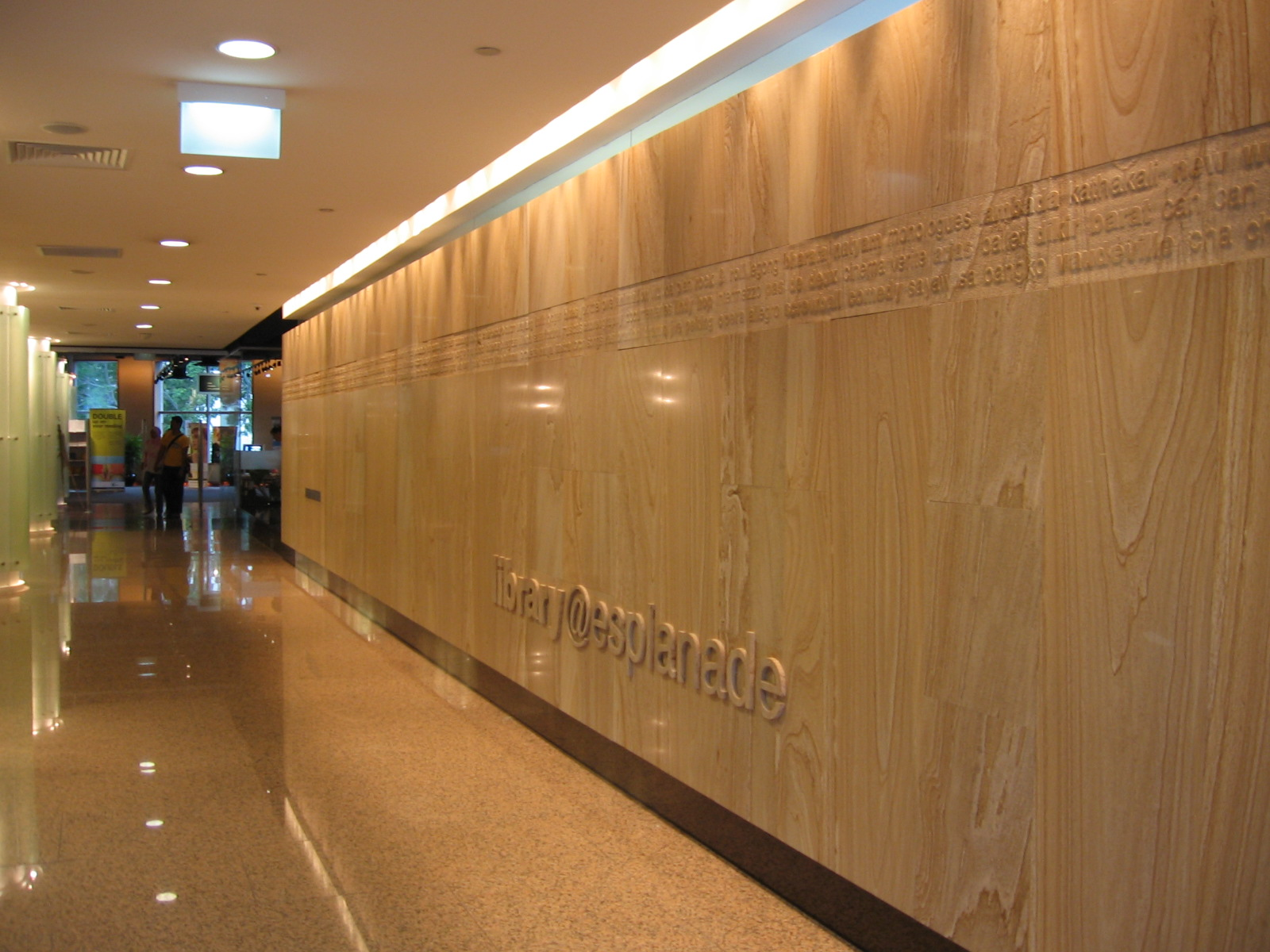
- library@esplanade
- Location: 8 Raffles Avenue, #03-01, Esplanade Mall, Singapore 039802, Singapore
- Type: Public library
- Established: 12 September 2002; 24 years ago
- Dissolved: 30 June 2023; 3 years ago
- Branch of: National Library Board

Collection
- Size: 50,000

Other information
- Public transit access: CC3 Esplanade; NS25 EW13 City Hall

library@esplanade (Chinese: 滨海艺术中心图书馆) was a public library managed by Singapore's National Library Board (NLB). It was located on the third floor of Esplanade Mall at Marina Centre, sited within Singapore's Downtown Core.

library@esplanade was Singapore's first public library for the performing arts (music, dance, theatre and film). It was also one of the few libraries in the world to be located within a performing arts complex, and was the second specialised boutique library in Singapore, after library@orchard.

== Background and history ==
library@esplanade was established as part of the Government of Singapore's plan to develop the nation into a renaissance city of the 21st century. The objective of the library was to bring the performing arts to the general public and vice versa. Its specialised book collections, programmes and information services seek to enhance the understanding and appreciation of the performing arts for people from all walks of life with the aim of demystifying the arts as an elitist luxury.

The library was officially opened on 12 September 2002, by Khaw Boon Wan, then Senior Minister of State for Transport and Information, Communications and the Arts.

== Amenities ==
Spanning a floor area of 2,300 square metres (24,760 square feet), the layout plan of library@esplanade comprised four clusters or "villages" for music, dance, theatre and film on the same level. This arrangement sought to create a conducive environment that supports creativity, learning and entertainment for both the layperson and the professional artiste.

The library featured an exhibition space known as the Innovation Gallery, a performing stage equipped with a glass projection wall and a miniature grand piano, a practice room with an upright piano and an electronic keyboard, screening rooms with home theatre systems, music sampling posts, a dance alley, a ″Silent″ Studio with electronic drums and instruments for the public to use, and a special collection room with an archive on the performing arts scene in Singapore. There was also a café in the library that was operated by a private vendor.

== Collection ==
library@esplanade had a start-up collection of about 50,000 volumes of performing arts materials in both print and electronic formats. The collection comprised books on history and biography, instructional textbooks, periodicals and magazines, screenplays, play scripts, dance notations, and music scores. There was also a small fiction section on novels that films are based on.

The library also had audio-visual materials that included classical, jazz and pop music CDs, as well as DVDs, VCDs and videotapes of films, dance performances, opera and orchestral performances, and Broadway theatre productions.

There were also journals, encyclopaedias and directories available for reference. The collection was international in scope, with an emphasis on the performing arts in Singapore and Asia. Like library@orchard, library@esplanade did not have any children's books.

== Programmes and exhibitions ==
The library worked closely with practitioners and groups in the local performing arts scene to deliver programmes that reach out to various target audiences. Some of library@esplanade's regular programmes included Esplanade Co.'s Festival programmes, SSO Pre-concert talks, music performances and recitals, talks by industry veterans and arts practitioners, as well as film screenings. The programmes were held mostly on weekends at the Open Stage, and updated programme listings could be found on the library@esplanade's Facebook page.

The library also regularly featured exhibitions at four main areas - Glass Display, Innovation Gallery, Dance Village, and Music Village. Notable exhibitions included displays on the Cultural Medallion Recipients in the Performing Arts, highlights from MusicSG, as well as costume displays.

== Closure ==
On 2 May 2023, the National Library Board announced that the library@esplanade would be permanently closed on 30 June 2023, and its collections and programmes would be moved to the National Library Building.

On 8 September 2023, the Straits Times announced that part of the library@esplanade's collection would be made accessible as part of the NLB's Central Arts Library. The library@esplanade space would be turned into arts and commercial spaces by Esplanade.

== See also ==
- Culture of Singapore
- Dance in Singapore
- Music of Singapore
