= Web Archive Singapore =

Digital archive of Singaporean websites

WebArchiveSG
- Website type: Web archive
- Available in: 4 languages
- List of languages Chinese, English, Malay, Tamil
- Country of origin: Singapore
- Owner: National Library Board
- Website: eresources.nlb.gov.sg/webarchives/landing-page
- Launched: 18 October 2006; 19 years ago

Web Archive Singapore (WAS), also known as WebArchiveSG, is a web-archiving initiative managed by the National Library Board. Its goal is to preserve Singapore's national digital heritage by storing digital records and maintaining access for the public.

== Background ==
As the world wide web began to gain prominence in the early 2000s, the National Library of Singapore (NLS) decided to identify and preserve websites and digital spaces of importance to the nation of Singapore. The formalisation of Singapore as a country inspired many organisations, private and public, to establish a sense of national identity. WebArchive SG preserves the presence and actions of Singaporeans online against issues like link rot.

WebArchiveSG was created on 18 October 2006.

The National Library Board Act of 2019 created official mandates for WebArchiveSG, as well as establishing funding for the National Library of Singapore to continue the project.

== Content ==
Content stored in the archive is collected by both archivists and members of the public, who can submit both websites and social media accounts to be considered for inclusion. WebArchiveSG evaluates submissions based on notability and connection to Singaporean national identity. This may include official .sg websites, as well as websites under different domain names that reflect the work or interests of individual Singaporeans or a Singaporean organisation.

Under the National Library Board Act, all .sg websites may be archived by this initiative, but permission must still be granted by selected websites that do not use .sg, as they maintain copyright of their content.

The initiative utilises a web crawler, which will archive available versions of a website annually. The websites include those in English, Chinese, Malay, and Tamil.

The archival collection is of use to both professional and non-professional entities. Certain materials are only accessible via physical terminals at the Lee Kong Chian Reference Library.

== Projects ==
Librarians and archivists curate digital collections of website pages based on a particular topic or event in time, to promote education and use of the collections.

== See also ==
- List of web-archiving initiatives
- Libraries in Singapore
