= Queenstown Public Library =

Public library in Singapore

Coordinates: 1.298637°N 103.805356°E

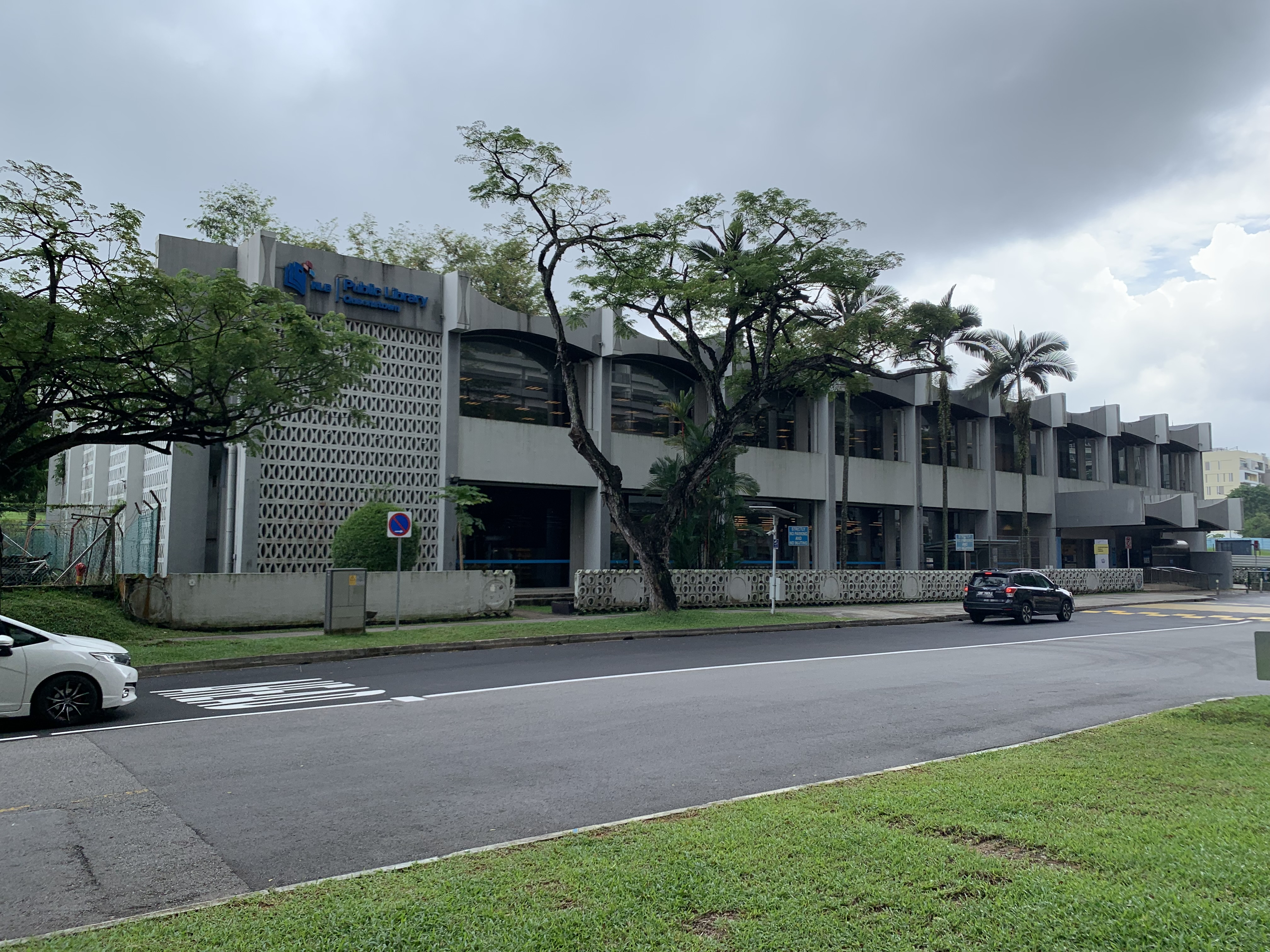
- Queenstown Public Library in 2025
- Location: 53 Margaret Drive, Singapore 149297, Singapore
- Type: Public library
- Established: 30 April 1970; 56 years ago
- Branch of: National Library Board

Queenstown Public Library is one of the 26 public libraries established by the National Library Board of Singapore. It was the first full-time Branch Library to be built by the National Library in its plan to decentralise home reading services. It pioneered several firsts amongst Branch Libraries, including becoming the first fully air-conditioned Branch in 1978, computerising its loan services in 1987, and lending video cassettes in 1997. It was refurbished in 2003. The building plans were approved by Mrs Hedwig Anuar, the then-Director of the National Library. Building construction began in November 1968 and with its completion, the building was handed over to the National Library on 26 December 1969. It is currently the oldest library in Singapore after the original National Library at Stamford Road was torn down, the first of 26 under the National Library Board (NLB) to be preserved as announced on 25 July 2014 and was gazetted for conservation under the Urban Redevelopment Authority's Master Plan 2014, as part of the medium-term physical development of Singapore on 6 June that year.

Located along Margaret Drive within walking distance of Queenstown MRT station, it serves the residents of Alexandra, Bukit Timah, Buona Vista, Clementi, Commonwealth, Dover, Ghim Moh, Holland, Pasir Panjang, Queenstown, Tanglin Halt and Ulu Pandan.

== History ==
Queenstown Public Library was officially opened as Queenstown Branch Library on 30 April 1970 by then Prime Minister of Singapore, Lee Kuan Yew.

On 7 October 1987, Queenstown Branch Library became the first public library in the National Library Boards network to have its library services put online.

The Queenstown Branch Library was renamed as Queenstown Community Library when the National Library became a Statutory Board on 1 September 1995.

The library was closed on 4 February 2003 for upgrading work and was officially reopened on 31 October that year by Associate Professor Koo Tsai Kee, Senior Parliamentary Secretary for the Ministry of Defence and Ministry of National Development, and Member of Parliament for Tanjong Pagar Group Representation Constituency.

Originally slated to be closed for a "large-scale redesign" from early 2025 to 2027, the library will instead shut from September 2026 to late 2028.

== Layout ==
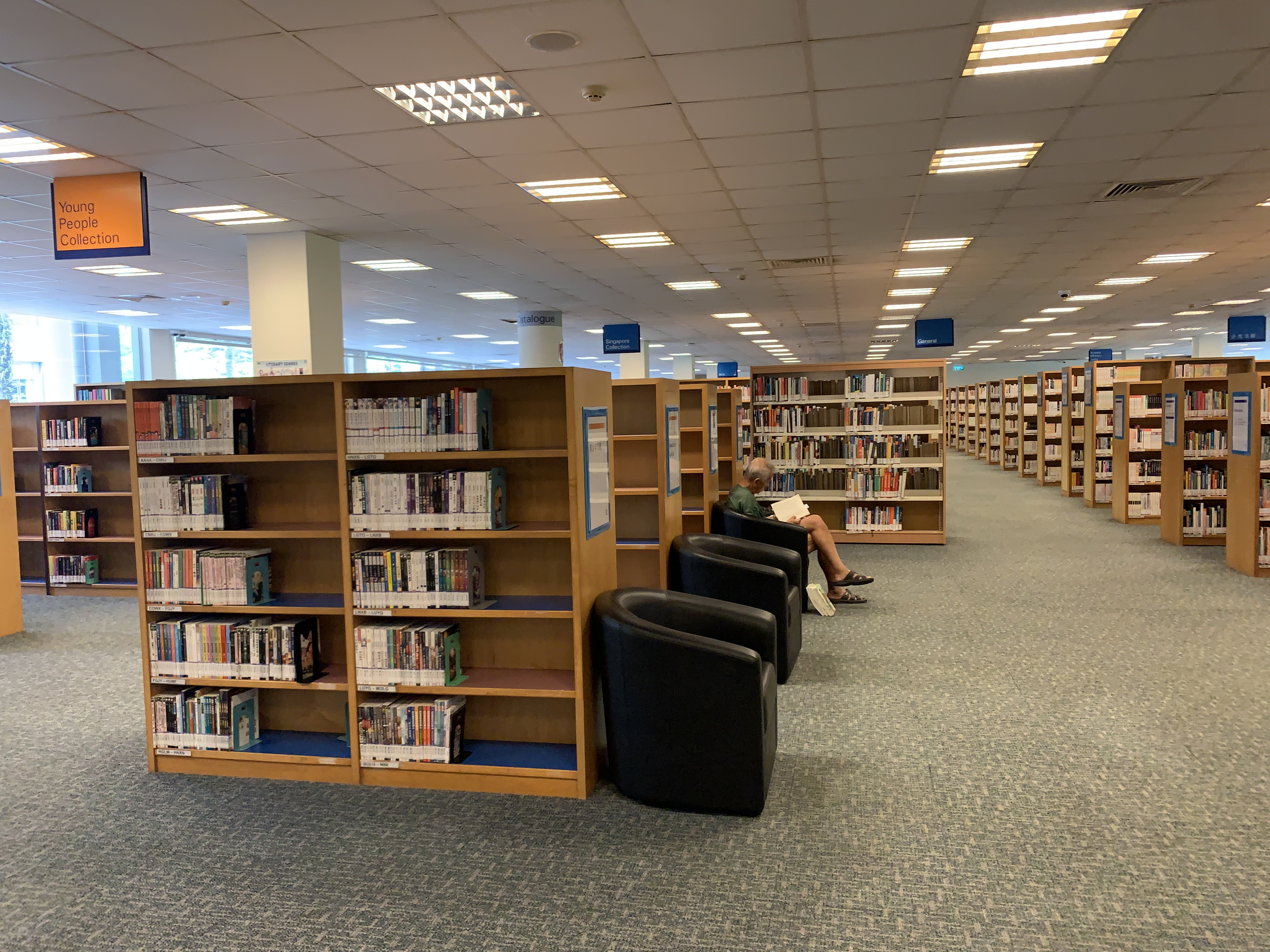
The 2nd floor of the Queenstown Public Library

Covering an area of 3,349 m^{2}, the library spans two levels and serves the residents of Alexandra, Bukit Timah, Buona Vista, Clementi, Commonwealth, Dover, Ghim Moh, Holland, Pasir Panjang, Queenstown, Tanglin Halt and Ulu Pandan.

=== First floor ===
- Adults' collection
- Magazines
- Children's collection
- Cafe Galilee
- Staff workroom
- Programme zone
- Newspaper area
- Multimedia stations

=== Second floor ===
- Young people's collection
- Adults' collection
