= Hedwig Anuar =

Singaporean librarian

- Born: Aroozoo, Hedwig; 19 November 1928 (age 97); Johor Bahru, Malaysia
- Occupation: Librarian

Hedwig Anuar (born 19 November 1928) is a Malaysian-born Singaporean librarian who was the a director of the National Library in 1960.

As a librarian and an administrator, she was responsible for many of the foundations of the modern library system in Singapore. Until her retirement in 1990, the National Library made considerable developments, growing from one library to nine and a change in membership from 43,000 to 333,000. As an administrator, she began several important library projects for children and youth in Malaysia and worked extensively with the media to promote these and other services.

Hedwig also contributed to The Hedwig Anuar Children’s Book Award (HABA) is presented biennially by the Singapore Book Council to an outstanding children’s book written by a Singapore citizen or Permanent Resident.

Hedwig is also a founding member of the Association of Women for Action and Research (AWARE).
