= Central Arts Library =

Central Arts Library (Simplified Chinese: 中央艺术图书馆) is a public arts library under the National Library Board in Singapore. Opened on 12 December 2024 by Minister of State for Digital Development and Information, Rahayu Mahzam, the library is located on the fifth floor of the National Library at Victoria Street.

== History and Origins ==
The first public library for the performing arts in Singapore is library@esplanade which opened in 2002. It was developed in lieu of the Government of Singapore's strategy to transform the nation into a renaissance city of the 21st century. The library's purpose was to encourage and inspire people from all walks of life to understand and appreciate arts and culture while challenging their perception of arts as an elitist luxury. On 2 May 2023, The National Library Board announced that the library@esplanade will be permanently closed on 30 June 2023, and its collections and programmes will be moved to the National Library in the Civic District. This performing arts collection is now housed under the new Central Arts Library which is primarily located in the National Library Building.

In addition to the performing arts collection, it was announced on 6 September 2024 that the library@orchard will undergo a two-years revamp and that the design and applied arts collection will be relocated to Central Arts Library. This collection can be found in the unmanned pop-up location at the University of the Arts Singapore, Level 2, Gallery 2 of the National Design Centre. The collation of the performing arts, design and applied arts collection can better serve communities, practitioners, students, academics and researchers. National Library Board Chief Executive Officer Mr Ng Cher Pong said: “With the centralising of NLB’s arts resources here in the heart of the Civic District, we hope to make discovering, reading and learning about the arts easier for everyone. We also look forward to working with the community, including our ongoing partnership with the University of the Arts Singapore, to create more opportunities for people to experience the arts, and be inspired by it.”

During the interim between the closure of library@esplanade and the opening of the physical space of Central Arts Library in December 2024, the library has started planning for programmes in the National Library Building and offering reservation services for selected materials. Between August 2023 and December 2024, the Central Arts Library has planned over 90 performing arts programmes, drawing about 7,000 participants into the National Library Building. These programmes include movie screenings, performances and workshops, and DVD and Blu-ray discs reservation services include motion pictures, ballet, Western and Chinese Opera.

== Collections ==
The Central Arts Library's collection includes a variety of formats for performing arts, design, and applied arts topics. This includes books, theatre scripts, screenplays, music scores, music CDs, DVD, and Blu-ray discs.

Central Arts Library is currently the only public library in Singapore with a lending collection of music CDs, music scores, screenplays, NC16 & M18-rated DVD and Blu-ray discs. The library also houses the largest lending collection of DVD and Blu-ray discs and theatre playscripts across Singapore's public libraries. These formats can be found at Level 5 of the National Library Building.

The design and applied arts collection is located at the University of the Arts Singapore, Level 2, Gallery 2 of the National Design Centre. This pop-up library is just across the National Library Building, near the primary space. With around 5500 titles available, library users can explore design topics surrounding people, space, visual and product. Library visitors can enter the pop-up library by scanning their ID or requesting a QR code day pass. Books can only be borrowed via the NLB Mobile app.

== Facilities ==
Similarly to the library@esplanade, Central Arts Library has retained the three rentable performing arts facilities, Piano Practice Room, Silent Studio and Screening Room. All three facilities can be found in the National Library Building, across Level 5 and Level 8.

=== Piano Practice Room ===
Located within Central Arts Library at Level 5, this 107 sqft room contains a baby grand piano suitable for visitors who are interested in practicing the piano in the central region. The maximum number of users allowed at a time is 3, and each user can rent the facility for up to 2 hours a day.

=== Silent Studio ===
Located within Central Arts Library at Level 5, the rentable silent studio is meant for users interested in a studio to jam, rehearse, practice instrument or for recording purposes. This 155 sqft facility provides equipment such as an electric guitar, a steel-string acoustic guitar, a classical guitar, a bass guitar, a digital piano, a drum kit and a 4-channel mixer. The studio also includes microphones, music stands and headphones. The maximum number of users allowed at a time is 7, and each user can rent the facility for up to 2 hours.

=== Screening Room ===
Located within the Lee Kong Chien Reference Library on level 8, the rentable screening room is available for library visitors who have borrowed DVDs or Blu-ray discs from either the Central Arts Library or Lee Kong Chien Reference Library. There are about 30,000 titles at the Central Arts Library to choose from. This 120sqft facility includes a 4K LED TV, 4K Blu-ray player and a home theatre audio studio. The maximum number of users allowed at a time is 4, and each user can rent the facility for up to 3 hours.

== Location ==
The library is a short walk from the Bugis MRT station.
