= Sato Kogyo =

Sato Kogyo Co. Ltd.
- Sato Kogyo logo
- Company type: Public limited
- Traded as: Sato Kogyo
- Industry: Construction contractor
- Founded: 1862 in Japan
- Headquarters: Tokyo, Japan
- Key people: Hiroshi Heima (President)
- Website: www.satokogyo.com.sg

Sato Kogyo Co. Ltd. is Japan's oldest construction contractor company.

== History ==
Sato Kogyo was founded in 1862.
