= Vanguard Building =

Historic building in Singapore

Coordinates: 1.2947°N 103.8498°E

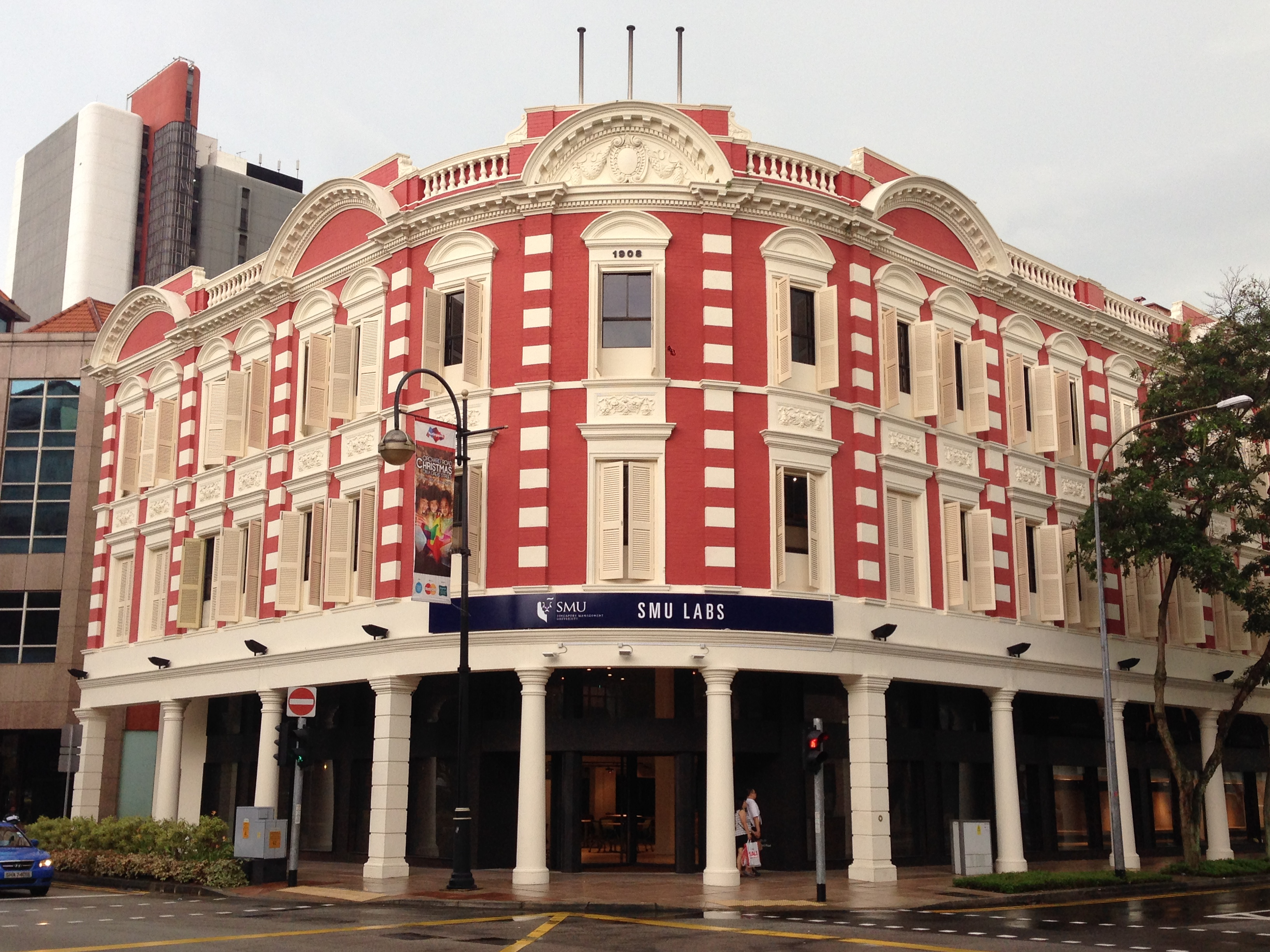
The building in 2014

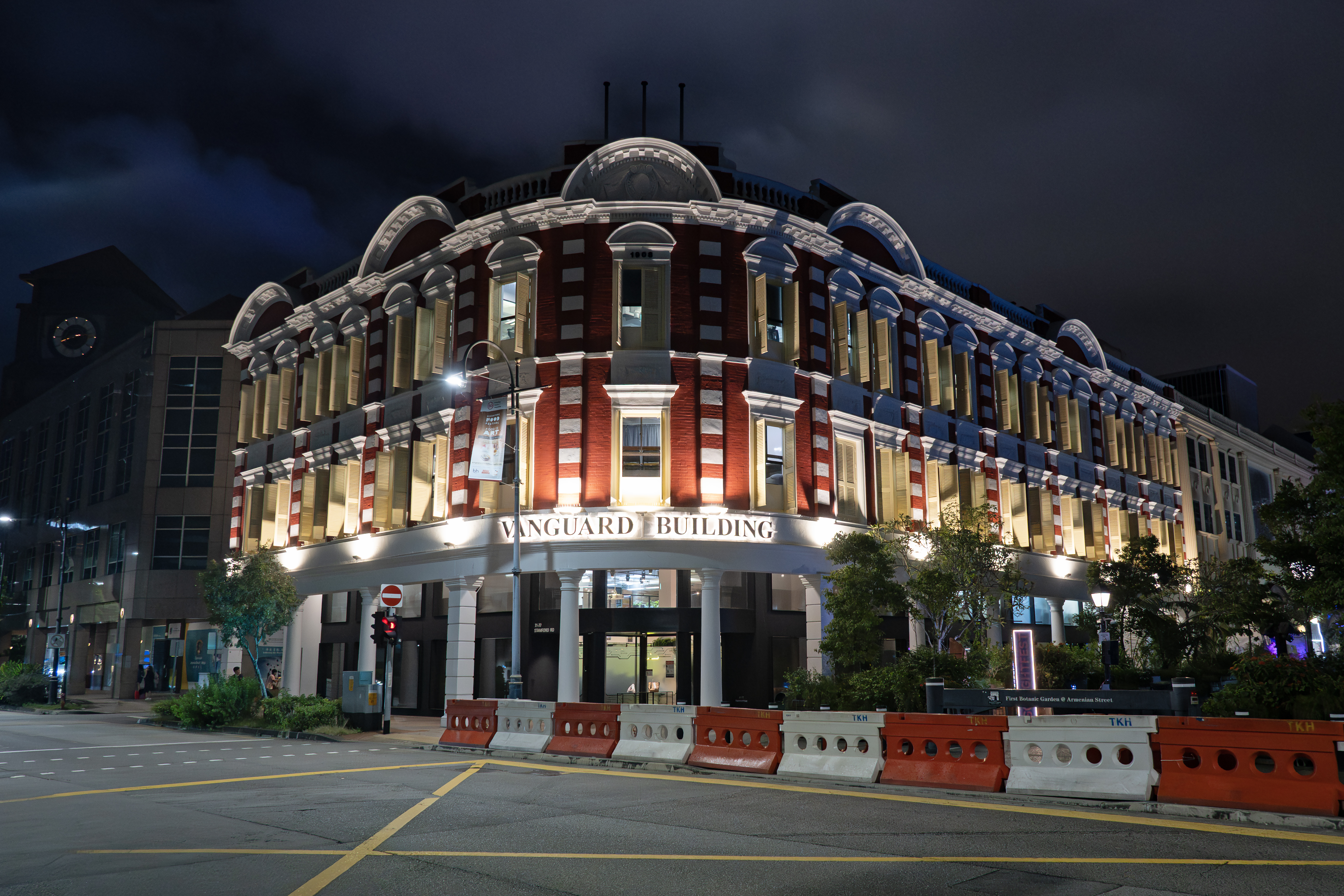
Vanguard Building in 2025.

The Vanguard Building, formerly known as the Malaysia Publishing House Building, or simply the MPH Building, is a historic building on the corner of Armenian Street and Stamford Road. It initially housed the Methodist Publishing House. Since 2014, it has been leased to the Singapore Management University.

== Description ==
The building is one of the few remaining examples of Edwardian architecture in Singapore. It features pedimented and arched windows and rusticated piers. It also features Baroque arches, which are supported by a first-storey arcade.

== History ==
The building was built in 1908, housing the Methodist Publishing House. It was designed by architectural firm Swan & Maclaren. Following WWII, Frank Cooper Sands, then Managing Director of MPH, restored and reopened the bookstore.

In 1988, it was announced that the interior of the building would be redeveloped for $10 million. The building reopened in November 1991, with a new cafe and the third floor being dedicated to music. The Singapore branch of the United States Information Service was relocated to the top floor of the newly redeveloped building.

Vanguard Interiors bought the property for $25 million and leased it back to the MPH until 2003. In 2003, the building was gazetted for conservation by the Urban Redevelopment Authority. It was then leased to AIT Unicampus. In October 2006, Vanguard Interiors moved its offices and its showroom into the building.

The Singapore Management University signed a five-year lease for the building in 2014 and renamed it SMU Labs.
