= Tampines Library =

Regional library in Singapore

Coordinates: 1.3522°N 103.9412°E

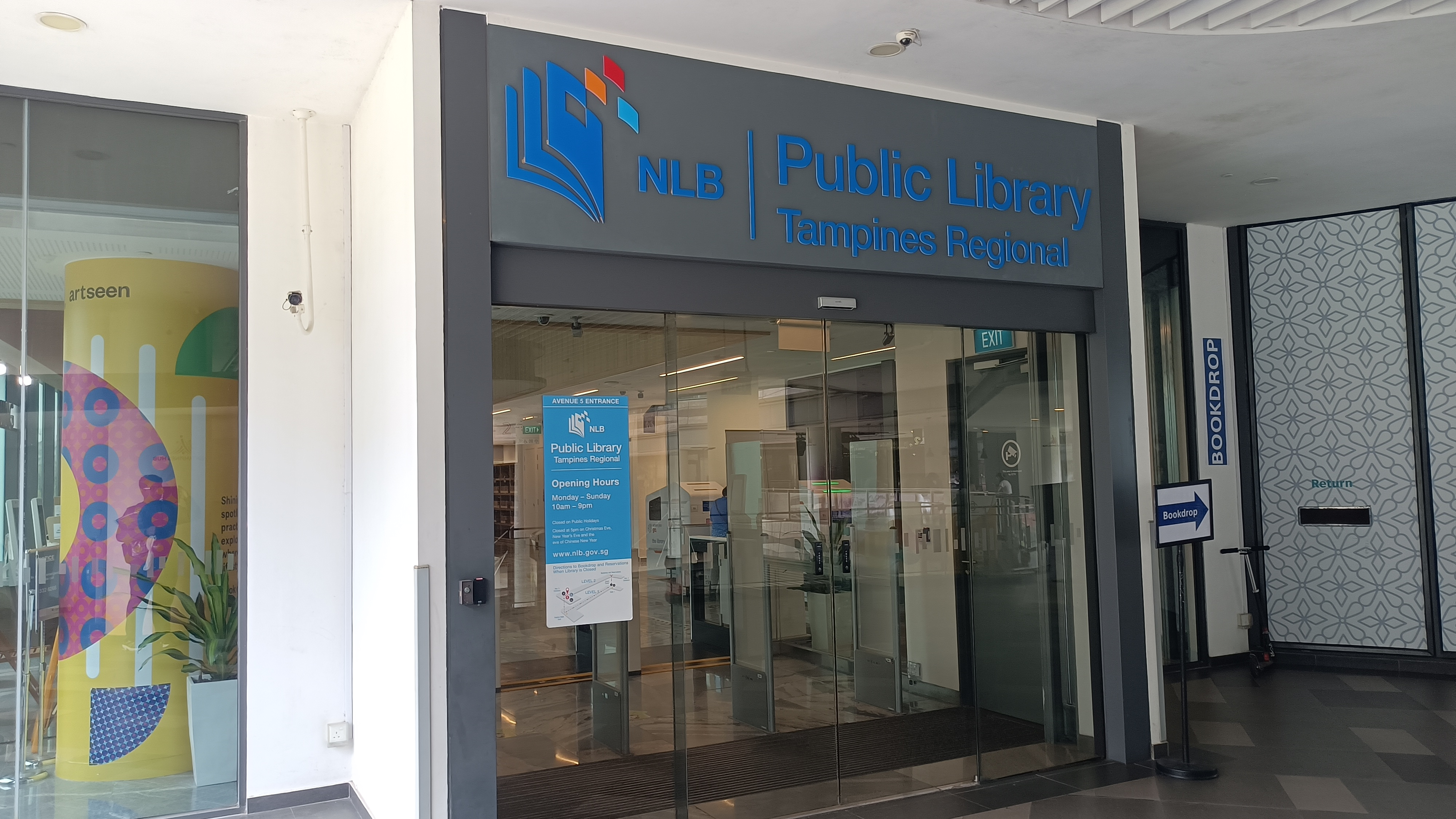
- Tampines Library
- Location: 1 Tampines Walk, #02-01, Our Tampines Hub, Singapore 528523, Singapore
- Type: Regional Library
- Established: 3 December 1994; 31 years ago
- Branch of: National Library Board
- Public transit access: EW2 – DT32 Tampines, Tampines Bus Interchange

Tampines Library (Chinese: 淡滨尼图书馆; Malay: Perpustakaan Tampines; Tamil: தெம்பினிஸ் நூலகம்) is a library located at Our Tampines Hub, Singapore. It is the first regional library in Singapore.

The library was opened in 1994 at Tampines New Town and was closed in June 2017 for upgrading. It was re-opened on 5 August 2017 at Our Tampines Hub.

== History ==
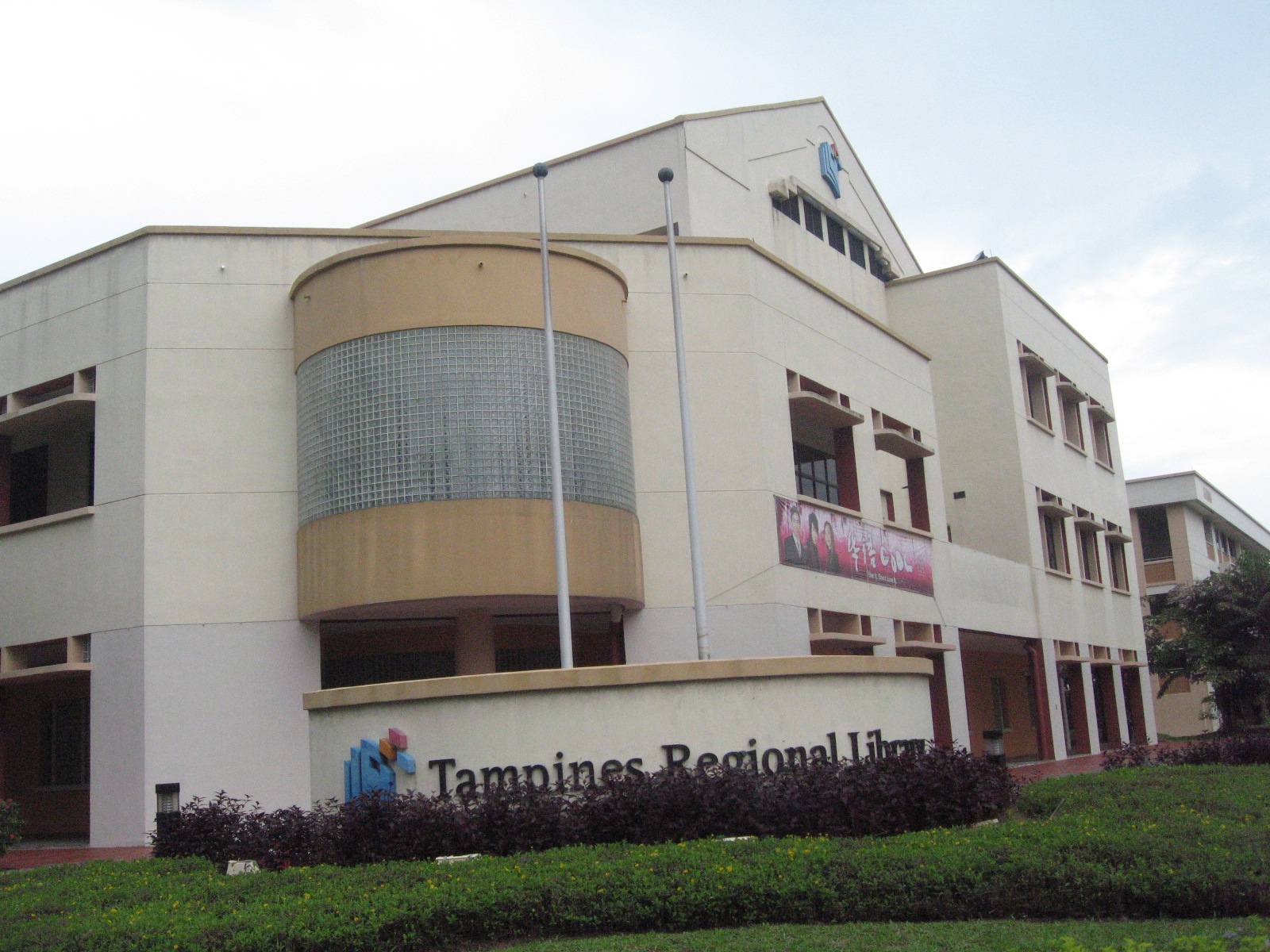
Former Tampines Regional Library building (1994-2017)

It was first opened at Tampines Avenue 7 on 3 December 1994 by Senior Minister of State for Education and Health, Aline Wong.

The 6,208-square metre library was upgraded in 1998 to include better facilities. A Chinese library service was inaugurated in May 1998, after the signing of Understanding of Memorandum with the National Libraries of Beijing and Shanghai. The library also has conference and exhibition facilities. The library houses over 235,000 books with 63,000 books in Chinese, the largest collection of Chinese books in the library network. There is a vast collection of materials on overseas Chinese and children's books. The library also had a children's playhouse on the ground floor, IT and business books and microfilm services. It was temporarily closed on 4 June 2017 for upgrading and relocation.

== Current building ==
It was reopened on 5 August 2017 at its new location within, Our Tampines Hub (OTH). The renovation increased floor space to 10,900-square meters, while boosting the library's collection to approximately 350,000 books. The interior consists of five publicly available floors, occupying sections of the second to sixth levels of OTH.

New facilities included a culinary studio, programme zone, co-working lounge and indoor playground. Another addition was a branch of the National Library Board's MakeIT, a studio open to the public, allowing library members to utilise technology like 3D printers and hardware kits for free while creating a space for technology-related workshops and talks.

== Transport links ==
Situated close to the Tampines MRT station and bus interchange, the library covers a floor area of 12,600 square metres.
