= National Library, Singapore =

Singapore's national public library

National Library
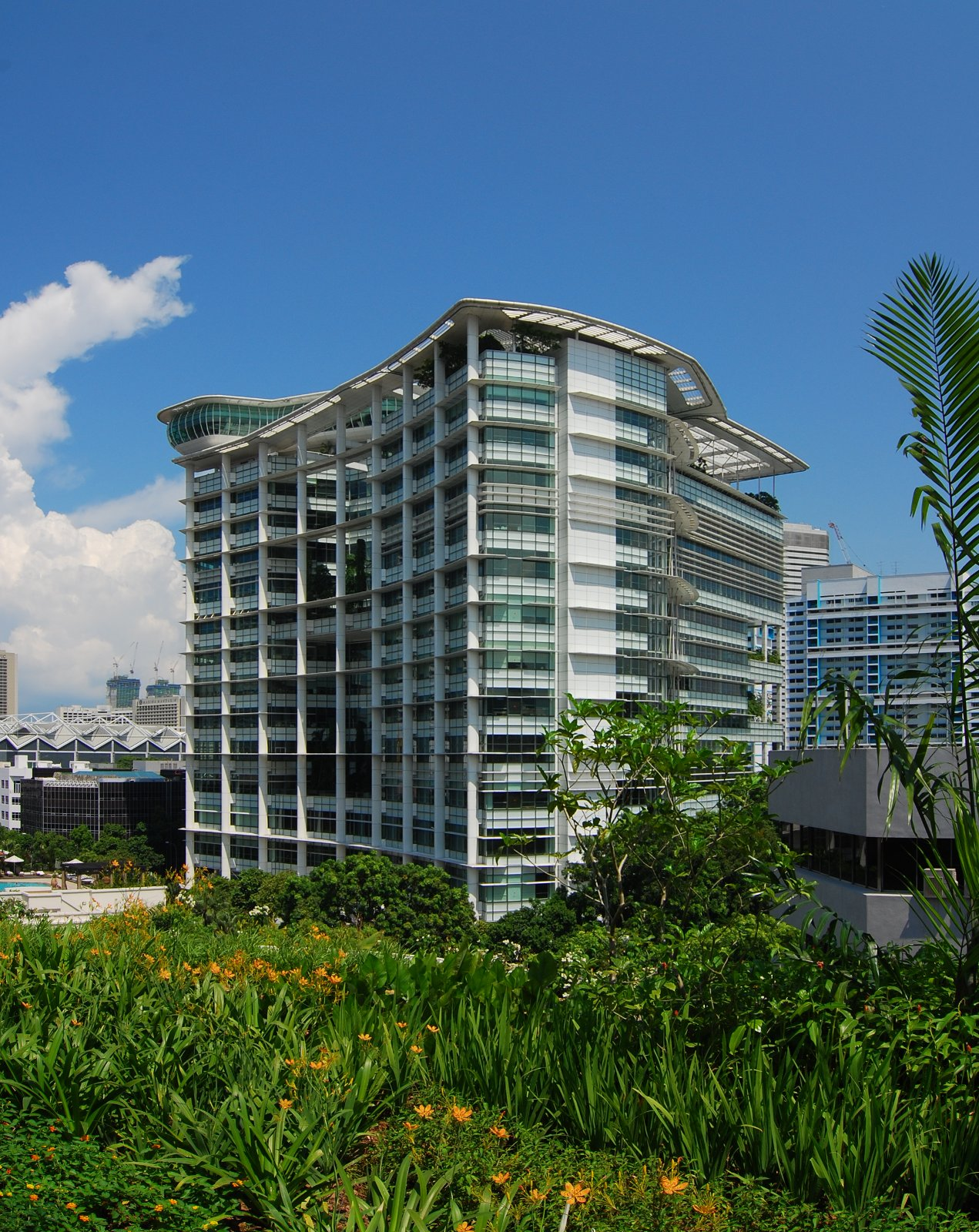
- The National Library in Victoria Street, Singapore
- 1°17′52″N 103°51′15.2″E
- Location: 100 Victoria Street, Singapore 188064, Singapore
- Type: Public library
- Established: 1823; 203 years ago
- Branch of: National Library Board

Other information
- Director: Ng Cher Pong, CEO; Lee Seow Hiang, Chairman
- Website: www.nlb.gov.sg

National Library, Singapore

Chinese name
- Traditional Chinese: 國家圖書館
- Simplified Chinese: 国家图书馆
Transcriptions
Standard Mandarin
- Hanyu Pinyin: Guójiā túshū guǎn

Malay name
- Malay: Perpustakaan Negara

Tamil name
- Tamil: தேசிய நூலகம்

The National Library is the flagship national library of Singapore. A subsidiary of the National Library Board (NLB), it consists of twin 16-storey blocks, linked by bridges on the upper floors, with three underground basements located on an 11,304-square-metre (121,680 sq ft) prime location in Victoria Street within the Downtown Core.

Costing S$208,000,000 (2005) (US$155,223,881), it is approximately 103 m (338-foot) high with a total gross floor area of about 58,800 m^{2} (633,000-square-foot), housing more than 2.5 million items in various formats, being physical books and magazines, CD-ROMs, microfiches, newspapers (including 77 foreign daily press) and rare publications, making it the largest public library in Southeast Asia.

The library has 28 regional branches throughout the country such as in Jurong, Tampines and Woodlands as well as affiliations with academic and professional libraries. The branch libraries are open to the general public and consist of circulating libraries. The National Library also consists of research libraries, which are also open to the general public.

== History ==
The National Library traces its history back to 1823 with the establishment of the first national public library as suggested by Stamford Raffles, the founder of modern Singapore. It was renamed the Hullett Memorial Library in 1923, co-located with Singapore's first school, Raffles Institution, at a site now occupied by the Raffles City complex. It moved to a separate Library and Museum Building in 1887 under the name of Raffles Library as part of the Raffles Museum, before moving to the Stamford Road premises in 1960 under the name of the National Library of Singapore where it was opened by Yusof Ishak, the first President of Singapore.

=== Central Public Library ===
Formerly known as the Central Lending Library at 91 Stamford Road, the collection was relocated to 100 Victoria Street and opened as the Central Public Library in 2005.

It is located on Basement 1 of the National Library Building with a floor area of 6,407 m^{2} (68,960-square-foot) and housed 310,000 books.

In June 2022, the Central Public Library was completely overhauled, and re-opened in January 2024 as a venue offering a myriad of learning experiences for all ages.

The lending library is currently home to the Children's Biodiversity Library by S.E.A. Aquarium, and also offers content on Singapore culture, literature and sustainability.

=== Lee Kong Chian Reference Library ===
Previously known as the National Reference Library, the Lee Kong Chian Reference Library adopted its new name after receiving a S$60 million donation from the Lee Foundation, founded by Dr Lee Kong Chian.

It occupies seven storeys (Levels 7–13) at the National Library Building with a floor area of 14,265 square metres and housed more than 2.5 million items in various formats, physical books and magazines, CD-ROMs, microfiches. It hosts the access terminals for archived websites saved through the Internet preservation project WebArchiveSG.

== Current building ==
The current building, a 16-storey, two-block development situated in the city's Civic District, replaces the old National Library at Stamford Road, which closed on 31 March 2004.

In May 1999, Singapore-based Swan & Maclaren Architects won the tender to design the new National Library.

In March 2000, Minister for National Development Mah Bow Tan announced that the old National Library would be demolished and a new National Library built on Victoria Street.

In January 2001, Malaysian architect Ken Yeang split from the design team at Swan and Maclaren, resulting in the latter losing the library design contract.

Ken Yeang co-founded a Malaysian architectural firm T.R. Hamzah & Yeang based in Kuala Lumpur and the new firm was awarded the design contract for the National Library by the Ministry of National Development.

The library moved to its new home on 22 July 2005, and the building was officially opened on 12 November that year by the then-President S. R. Nathan. It is the flagship building of the National Library Board, bringing together the core functions of the old library by incorporating a reference library, known as the Lee Kong Chian Reference Library (simplified Chinese: 李光前参考图书馆; traditional Chinese: 李光前參考圖書館; pinyin: Lǐguāngqián cānkǎo túshū guǎn), as well as a public library, the Central Public Library, under one roof.

On the highest 16th level rooftop, there is a large closed area designed like a bubble called The Pod, used for functions and events. Although not a public viewing gallery, it has a panoramic 360-degree view of the city core and Marina bay area. The plaza on the ground floor has a cafe and is often used as an exhibition space. There are escalators on every floor, from Basement 3 to Level 14. The basement carpark has 246 lots. A number of old bricks from the old National Library building has been incorporated into the present building.

=== Sections ===
The main collections found at each level of the National Library Building include:

- Level B1 – Central Public Library Collection
- Level 5 - Central Arts Library
- Level 7 – Business, Science and Technology collections
- Level 8 – Arts, Social Sciences and Humanities collections
- Level 9 – Chinese, Malay and Tamil collections and the Asian Children's Literature collection
- Level 10 – Donors' Collections, Asian Children's Collection
- Level 11 – Singapore and Southeast Asia collections.
- Levels 12 and 13 – Rare Materials Collection (limited access, only with permission)

== Gallery ==
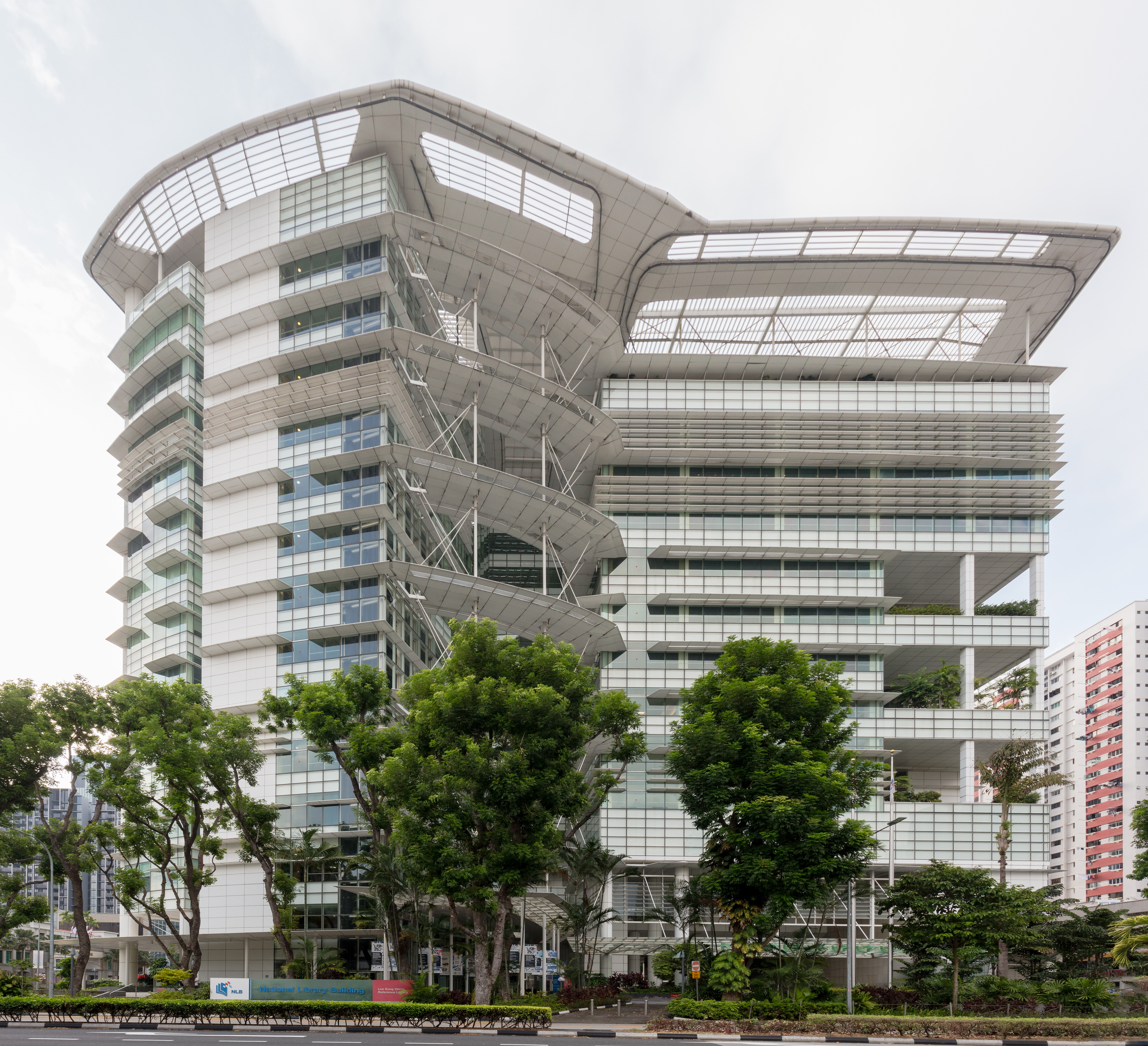
View from across the road

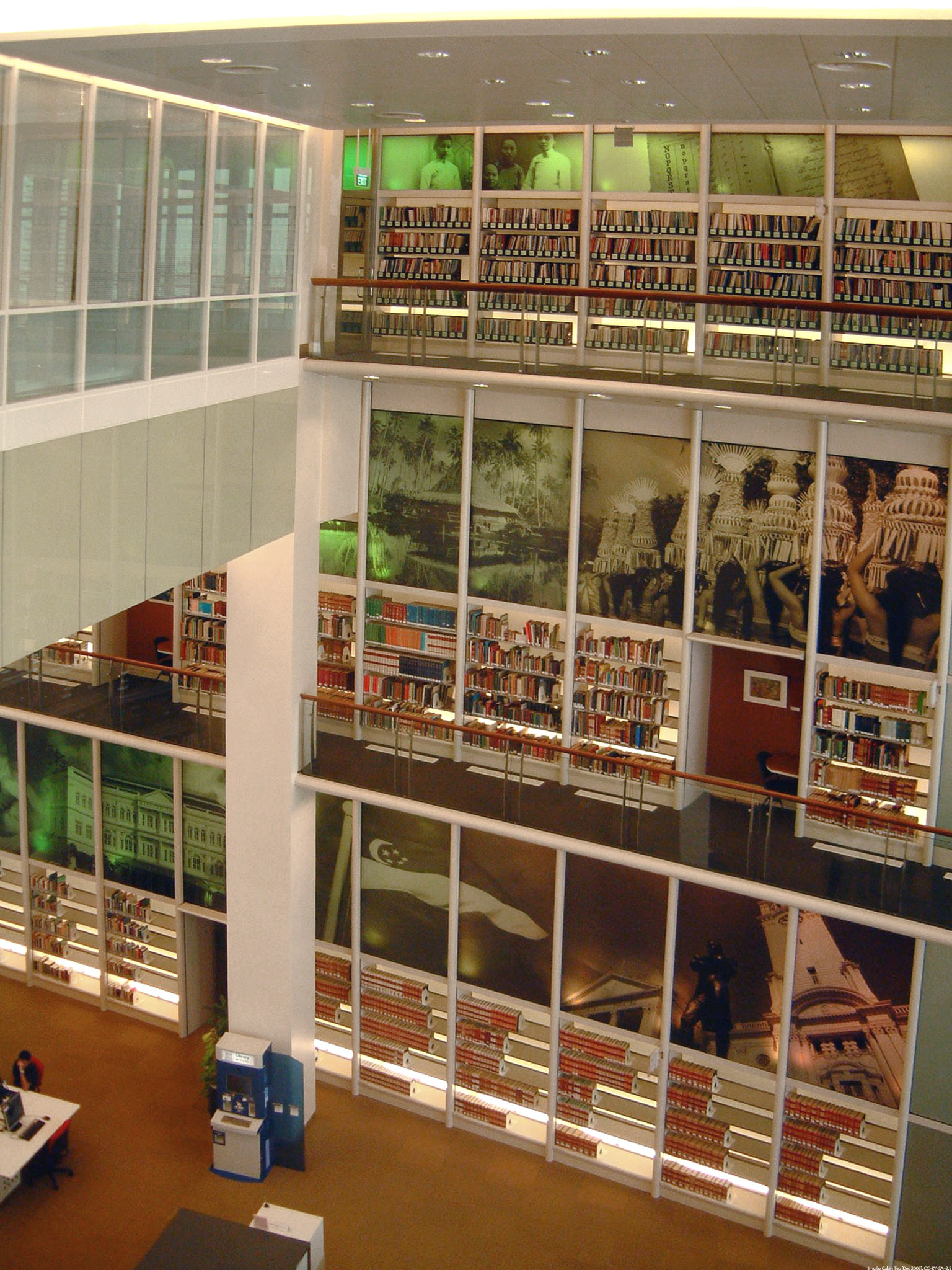
Singapore and Asian Collection, Lee Kong Chian Reference Library

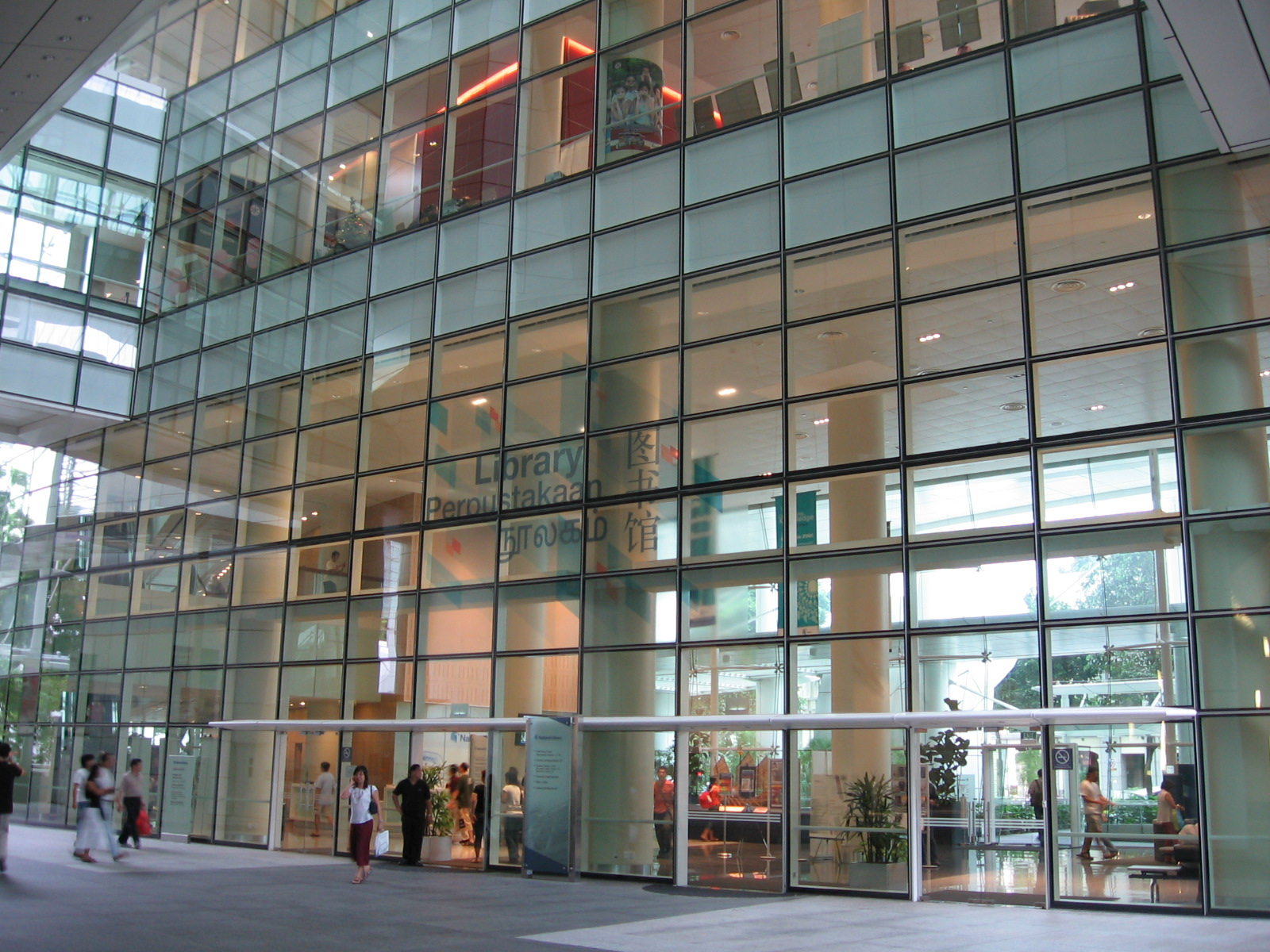
Entrance to the National Library

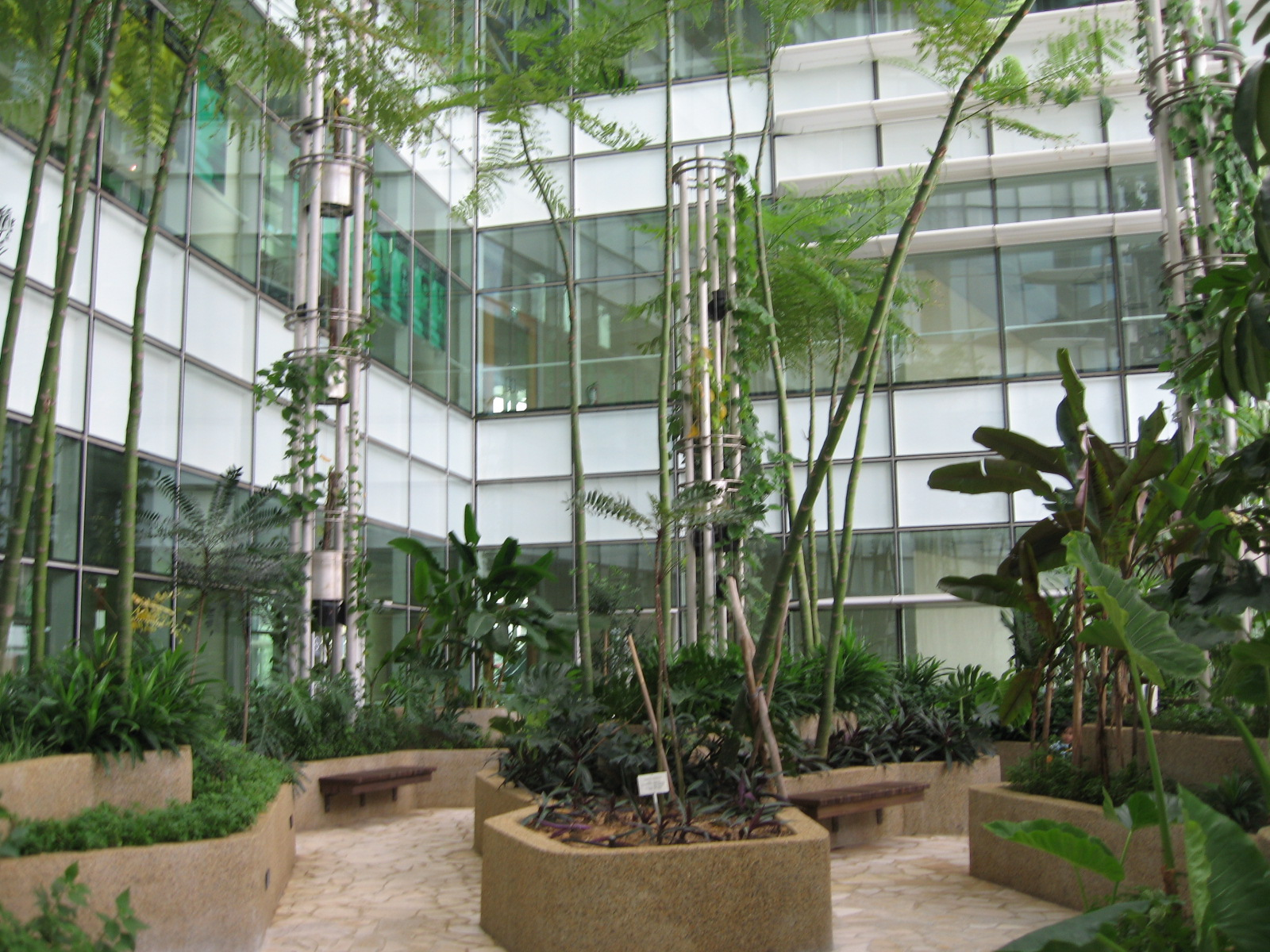
National Library Building's "The Retreat"

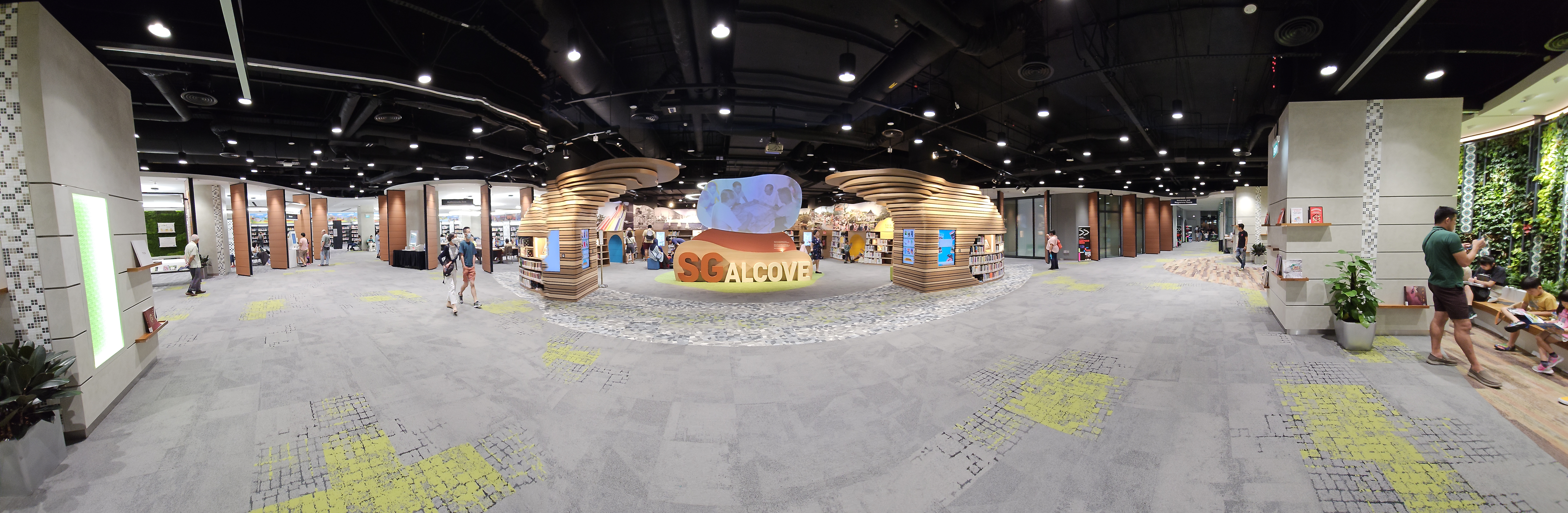
Panoramic view inside Central Public Library

== BiblioAsia ==
BiblioAsia is an academic journal published quarterly by the National Library, with content focused on the history and culture of Singapore. The BiblioAsia Podcast, also produced by the National Library, adapts these articles into audio narratives, in addition to exploring other aspects of Singaporean history.

== See also ==
- Education in Singapore
- Environmental planning
- Green building
- Green library
- List of national and state libraries
- Sustainable architecture
