= Stamford Road =

Road in Singapore

Coordinates: 1°17′39″N 103°51′04″E

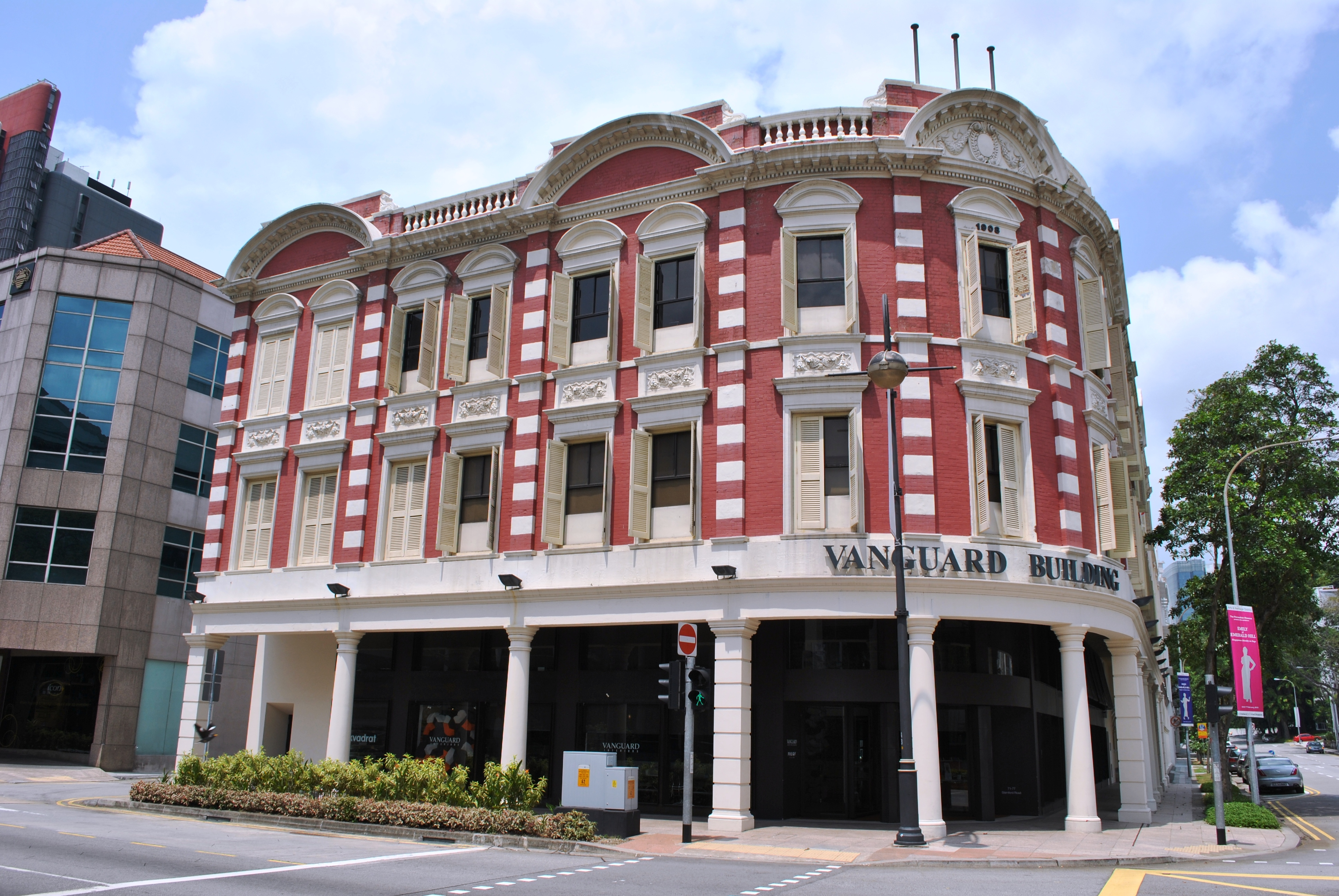
Vanguard Building, Stamford Road

Stamford Road (Chinese: 史丹福路; Malay: Jalan Stamford) is a one-way road in Singapore within the planning areas of Downtown Core and Museum. The road continues after the traffic light junction of Nicoll Highway, Esplanade Drive and Raffles Avenue towards Orchard Road. It then ends at the junction of Fort Canning Road, Bencoolen Street and Orchard Road, which it continues to be Orchard Road. Stamford Road is home to several landmarks, including Swissôtel The Stamford and the National Museum of Singapore.

== Etymology and history ==
Stamford Road was named after the modern founder of Singapore, Thomas Stamford Raffles. The road used to house the Saint Andrew's School from the late 19th century till 1941 when it moved to Woodsville Hill. The site was taken by the National Library in 1960 until it was demolished in 2005 to make way for the new Fort Canning Tunnel.

== Landmarks ==
This is a list of landmarks, from east to west.

- Civilian War Memorial
- Saint Andrew's Cathedral
- Raffles City and Swissôtel The Stamford
- City Hall MRT station
- SMRT Headquarters Building
- Capitol Building
- CHIJMES
- Stamford House
- Stamford Court
- Singapore Management University
- National Museum of Singapore
- Vanguard Building (formerly known as the MPH Building) - located at corner of Stamford Road and Armenian Street - former site of Methodist Publishing Press and MPH Bookstore
