= Project Sunshine for Japan =

2011 poster campaign for Japan

- Formation: April 2011
- Founder: Mansoureh (Mana) Rahnama
- Type: Global Networking / Art Campaign
- Legal status: Worldwide campaign
- Purpose: Support for Fukushima disaster survivors
- Headquarters: Dortmund, Germany

Project Sunshine for Japan (motto “Your colours can brighten the land of the rising sun again!”) is a worldwide campaign by Mansoureh (Mana) Rahnama in Dortmund, Germany. Rahnama started the networking project in April 2011 in the form of a poster competition in support of the survivors of the Fukushima Daiichi nuclear disaster Japan in March 2011.

== History ==
Around 400 international designers from 40 countries participated in the competition. A jury (Pamela Campagna + Thomas A. Scheiderbauer (Italy), Holger Jacobs (Great Britain), Wilfried Korfmacher (Germany), Uwe Loesch (Germany), Luba Lukova (USA), John Moore (Venezuela), Woody Pirtle (USA), Christopher Scott (Ireland), and Shinoske Sugisaki (Japan)) selected the 100 best posters. Six posters received recognition and awards (Mark Andersen (USA), Kristina Jovanovic (Serbia), Scott Laserow (USA), Zafar Lehimle (Turkey), Yossi Lemel (Israel), and Tristan Schmitz (Germany). The posters were presented in several exhibitions all over the world.

== The Book ==
Project Sunshine for Japan. Posters, Stories and poems about Fukushima (published in March 2013) presents the award-winning posters and literary articles by authors from 15 countries in 13 languages. Participating authors are Yuri Andrukhovych (Ukraine), Rolf Bertram (Germany), Andrea Biscaro (Italy), Biyú Suárez Céspedes (Bolivia), Kevin Chen (Taiwan), Thomas Dersee (Germany), Anton Eisenhauer (Germany), Rainer Frentzel-Beyme (Germany), (Germany), Günter Grass (Germany), Angelica Guzmán (Bolivia), Günther Hager (Austria), Ohm Jung Ho (Korea), Taro Igarashi (Japan), Mustafa Ijaz (Turkey), Koji Ikeda (Japan), Tokiko Kiyota (Japan), Prof. Dr. Masayuki Komatsu (Japan), Wilfried Korfmacher (Japan), Josef Lutz (Germany), Michiko Mae (Germany/Japan), Sarita Mansilla (Bolivia), Stephan Moldzio (Germany), Shinji Nakagawa (Japan), Akmal Nasery Basral (Indonesia), Sixto Paz Wells (Peru), Peace Boat (Japan), Michael Pilath (Germany), Mansoureh Rahnama (Germany/Iran), Sapna Rangaswamy (India), Naemi Reymann (Germany), RICOH Deutschland GmbH (Germany), Ryuichi Sakamoto (Japan), Prima Santika (Indonesia), Elisabeth Scherer (Germany), Gert Scobel (Germany), Shinnoske Sugisaki (Japan), Shinpei Takeda (Japan), Dejan Vukelic (Serbia), Izumi Yamaguchi (Japan), Peter Zec (Germany), Dirk Zimmermann (Germany), and Rui Zink (Rui Zink). The German poster designer Uwe Loesch created the book cover and exhibition posters.

== Exhibitions (selection) ==
- Fachhochschule Düsseldorf (University of Applied Science Düsseldorf) 2011
- Trade Fair Tokyo 2012
- Japanese Cultural Institute in Cologne 2012
- ATC Gallery at The Osaka Design Center 2012
- Peace Boat in Nagoya and Kobe Ports 2012
- Global Conference for a Nuclear Power Free World 2 in Tokyo 2012
- Kulturort Depot (Cultural Centre Depot) 2013
- Frankfurt Book Fair October 13, 2013
- House of Artists in Teheran 2013
- Vesal e Shiraz in Souratgar Gallery in Shiraz 2013
- Creative Network Center Mebic Ogimachi in Osaka 2014

== Publication ==
- Project Sunshine for Japan. Posters, Stories and poems about Fukushima, Editor Mansoureh Rahnama (D), Kettler, Lünen, 2013, ISBN 978-3-86206-219-5
