= Julien Royer =

French chef and restaurant owner (born 1982)

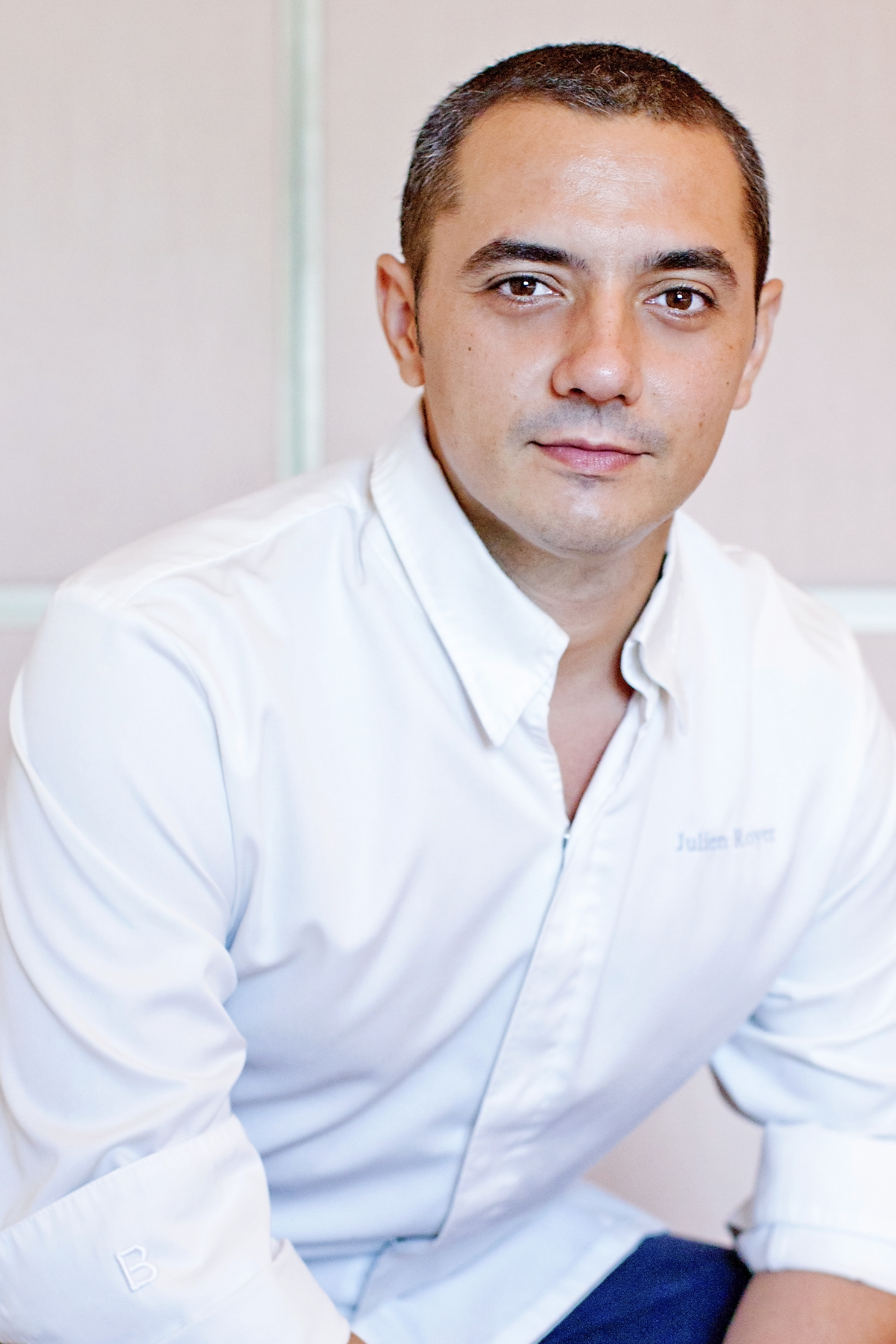
- Born: 1 September 1982 (age 43); Cantal, France
- Spouse: Marie-Agnes Fontana-Royer
- Culinary career
- Current restaurants: Odette (Singapore); Louise (Hong Kong)

Julien Royer (born 1 September 1982) is a French chef and restaurant owner. He is the Chef-owner of Odette in Singapore and Louise in Hong Kong. in 2019, Odette was awarded the highest distinction of 3 Michelin stars by the Michelin guide. Royer was born in Cantal, Central France to fourth-generation farmers.

== Early career ==
As a teenager, Royer's first job in the food industry was working for Michel Bras at Restaurant Bras in Laguiole, France. Later on, he moved to Durtol, a commune in Auvergne, Central France, where he worked for Les Maîtres Cuisiniers de France association member, Bernard Andrieux. In 2008, Royer moved to Singapore, where he served as Chef de cuisine at Brasserie Les Saveurs at the St Regis Hotel. In 2011, Royer served as Chef de cuisine at JAAN at Swissôtel The Stamford for 4 years before leaving to becoming Chef-owner of Odette in 2015.

== Restaurants owned and/or operated by Royer ==
=== Odette ===
Odette is a three Michelin star modern French restaurant owned and operated by Royer in collaboration with The Lo & Behold Group. The restaurant is located within the National Gallery Singapore. It opened in 2015 and was Royer's first solo restaurant.

=== Louise ===
Louise is a Michelin star restaurant owned and operated by Royer, in collaboration with JIA Group and The Lo & Behold Group, located at PMQ, Hong Kong. It was opened in 2019 and received its first Michelin star in 2020.

=== Claudine ===
Claudine is a French neo-brasserie that opened on November 16, 2021. Located on Harding Road in an old chapel, Claudine is the successor to The White Rabbit, a restaurant opened by the Lo & Behold Group in 2008 that closed after April 30, 2021.

== Awards ==
=== Julien Royer ===
Estrella Damm Chefs’ Choice Award 2023

Les Grandes Tables du Monde 2022: Prix Bernardaud du Meilleur Restaurateur

Le Chef 2017; 2018; 2019; 2020; 2021

The Best Chef Awards Top 100 Chefs: #86, Ambassador 2017; #28, 2022

World Gourmet Series Awards of Excellence 2017: Chef of the Year

World Gourmet Series Awards of Excellence 2014: KitchenAid Chef of the Year

At-Sunrice GlobalChef Award 2013

World Gourmet Series Awards of Excellence 2012: Meat and Livestock Australia ‘Rising Chef of the Year’

=== Odette ===
Michelin Guide
2019, 2021, 2022, 2023 Michelin Guide: Three Michelin Stars

2016, 2017, 2018 Michelin Guide: Two Michelin Stars

The World's 50 Best
2018 The World's 50 Best Restaurants: Number 28; 2019, Number 18; 2021, Number 8, 2022, Number 36; 2023, Number 14

Asia's 50 Best
2017 Asia's 50 Best Restaurants: Number 9; 2018, Number 5; 2019, Number 1; 2020, Number 1; 2021, Number 2; 2022, Number 8; 2023, Number 6

Gin Mare Art of Hospitality Award 2022

Les Grandes Tables Du Monde

La Liste

2017, 2018, 2019 La Liste: 88.50,; 2020, 94.00, 2021; 2022; 2023, 97.50

T.Dining Singapore

2017, 2018, 2019 Best Restaurant Awards: Best Service, Restaurant of the Year, Best Interior Design & Top 20 Restaurants

Wallpaper* Design Awards

2017: Best New Restaurant

Singapore Tourism Awards

2016: Best Dining Experience

=== Claudine ===
Asia's 50 Best Restaurants 2023: #85

=== Louise ===
Michelin Guide
2020 Michelin Guide: One Michelin Star, Louise
