= Old Supreme Court Building =

Old Supreme Court Building may refer to:

- Old Supreme Court Building, Hong Kong, the home of the Court of Final Appeal of Hong Kong.
- Old Supreme Court Building, Singapore, the former home of the Supreme Court of Singapore
