= Frank Dorrington Ward =

British architect (1885–1972)

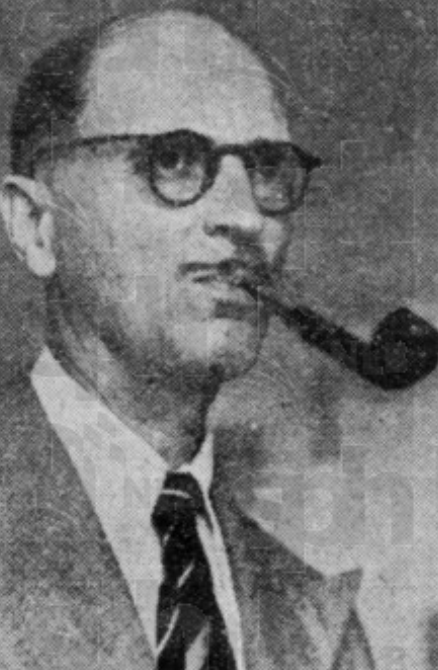
Frank Dorrington Ward

Frank Dorrington Ward (17 April 1885 - 1972) was a British architect who served as the chief architect of the Public Works Department of the Straits Settlements. He designed several buildings in Singapore which have since become prominent landmarks, such as the Old Supreme Court Building.

== Early life and education ==
Ward was born in Hastings, England on 17 April 1885. His father was prominent architect Henry Ward. His elder brother, Henry Jr., was also an architect. He attended Kent College in Canterbury.

== Career ==
He became an associate of the Royal Institute of British Architects in 1909. Later that year, he joined the architectural department of the London County Council. He served in the Corps of Royal Engineers from 1915 to 1919.

He came to the Straits Settlements in 1920 and was appointed the chief architect of the Public Works Department. He helped to found the Singapore Society of Architects in 1923.

He became a fellow of the Royal Institute of British Architects in 1939. He designed the Custom House, Clifford Pier, Beach Road Camp Block 9, the Old Hill Street Police Station, the terminal building of Kallang Airport, the Former Victoria School Building, the Old Supreme Court Building, the Criminal Investigation Department Headquarters, the Maxwell Chambers Suites, and the Malacca General Hospital in Malacca.

He left his position and left Singapore on 25 August 1939. He was conferred the OBE in 1941.

== Personal life and death ==
He was married. One of his sons, Ian Dorrington Ward, also became an architect. He was a Freemason.

He died in 1972.
