= Odette (restaurant) =

Singaporean restaurant

- Interactive map of Odette

Restaurant information
- Established: 2015
- Owner(s): Julien Royer, Lo & Behold Group
- Head chef: Julien Royer
- Food type: Fusion
- Rating: Michelin Guide 2019
- Location: 1 St Andrew’s Road #01-04, Singapore
- Coordinates: 1.28971°N 103.84925°E
- Seating capacity: 48
- Website: odetterestaurant.com

Odette is a Singaporean restaurant. Founded in 2015 by chef Julien Royer in collaboration with the local Lo & Behold Group, Odette features a fusion of French cuisine with Asian influences, including of Singapore's.

Odette has been rated as being one of the top restaurants in Asia, having received numerous awards, most notably being rated three Michelin stars, as well as winning first place in Asia's 50 Best Restaurants in 2020.

== Description ==
Odette is a 3100-square-foot restaurant located in the Supreme Court wing of the National Gallery Singapore. It serves French cuisine with Asian/Singaporean influences. Royer named the restaurant in honor of his grandmother, who taught him how to cook. He credits his grandmother and her cooking philosophies for inspiring him to become a chef, saying, "she taught me about respecting produce, about approaching cooking in a simple fashion, and how to elevate each ingredient like a piece of art." In coming up with the concept for his restaurant, Royer wanted to offer modern fine dining but without the "stiff, unwelcoming" atmosphere stereotypical of a fine dining experience.

Odette can seat up to 38 people, not including an additional eight-person private room. The design of the restaurant was overseen by Sacha Leong, a designer from London firm Universal Design Studio. Leong used white and light shades of pink to decorate the room. Singaporean artist Dawn Ng, who is married to Royer's business partner Wee Teng Wen, created a hanging installation in the main dining area called A Theory of Everything. Inspired by Royer's focus on simplicity in the kitchen, Ng took printed photographs of ingredients, sticking them onto oak panels and folding them.

Signature dishes at Odette include rosemary smoked organic eggs, mushroom tea, and a dish consisting of variations on the heirloom beetroot. According to Royer, the restaurant strives to pay tribute to his childhood by using the best ingredients sourced from small producers worldwide, sourcing ingredients from Australia, Japan, and as far away as Europe. He states, "I like that it falls between the range of tradition and innovation—food that’s tasty and uses classic cooking techniques, but is interpreted in a modern way." Royer also claims that food waste at Odette is minimized, due to the care put into designing the menu to use as much of the ingredients as possible.

== History ==
Odette was established in 2015 by Royer. Originally from Auvergne, France, he was previously the head chef of Jaan at the Swissôtel The Stamford, also in Singapore. While working at Jaan, regular customer Chong Siak Ching, the CEO of the National Gallery, asked if Royer would be interested in occupying an available space at the museum. After meeting with a local business partner, he agreed after a couple of weeks to open his own restaurant there, resigning from his position at Jaan in June 2015. Construction on the restaurant began sometime that summer, costing an estimated seven figures. In October, it was announced that Royer and managing partner Wee Teng Wen, of Lo & Behold Group, would be opening Odette in the National Gallery on 2 November. Wee had previously met Royer through mutual friends, and had discussed opening a restaurant together as early as 2014.

During the COVID-19 pandemic, Odette made adaptations to their business, such as installing air and surface purification systems inside the restaurant, and implementing curbside pickup for take-out orders. The take-out service, Odette at Home, gives people the opportunity to order a multi-course meal from a curated list of menu items, without needing to visit the restaurant in-person. According to Royer, approximately 40% of Odette's revenue during 2020 was from take-out orders.

With 2025 marking its tenth-year anniversary, Odette temporarily closed in September 2025 to update its interior design. They reopened after three months on 10 December with a shortened prix fixe menu.

== Reception ==
Odette is well-received by critics. Annette Tan of the Condé Nast Traveler claims that "restaurant obsessives consider Odette one of the best dining experiences in the world." The Straits Times' Wong Ah Yoke describes the atmosphere as "classy yet not ostentatious", and that the neutral color scheme is "contemporary, soothing and elegant". Both Tan and Wong enjoyed the food. Tan notes that "every dish is artful, complex, and most importantly delicious." Wong likes the "excellent" Kushiro flounder and "juicy" Challans Guineafowl.

Odette also received several awards since its debut. In its first year of opening, it won the "Best New Restaurant" award at the G Restaurant Awards. It later won "Restaurant of the Year" at the same awards in 2018. The restaurant got its first accolades by the Michelin Guide in 2016, receiving two stars. It later received three stars in 2019. In 2020, Odette received first place in Asia's 50 Best Restaurants, and second place the year after. It first made its appearance on the list in ninth place in 2017, winning "The Highest New Entry Award". It then moved up the Asian rankings to fifth place in 2018.

On the worldwide rankings, The World's 50 Best Restaurants, it debuted at 86th place in the 2017 list. moving its way up to 28th by 2018, and 18th by 2019. For his role in the kitchen at Odette, Royer won the "Chef of the Year" award at the World Gourmet Summit in 2017. He had previously won the award in 2014 while at Jaan. Odette also won "Restaurant of the Year" and "Old World Wine List of the Year" at the 2019 World Gourmet Summit awards.
