= Criminal Investigation Department Headquarters =

Demolished building in Central Area, Singapore

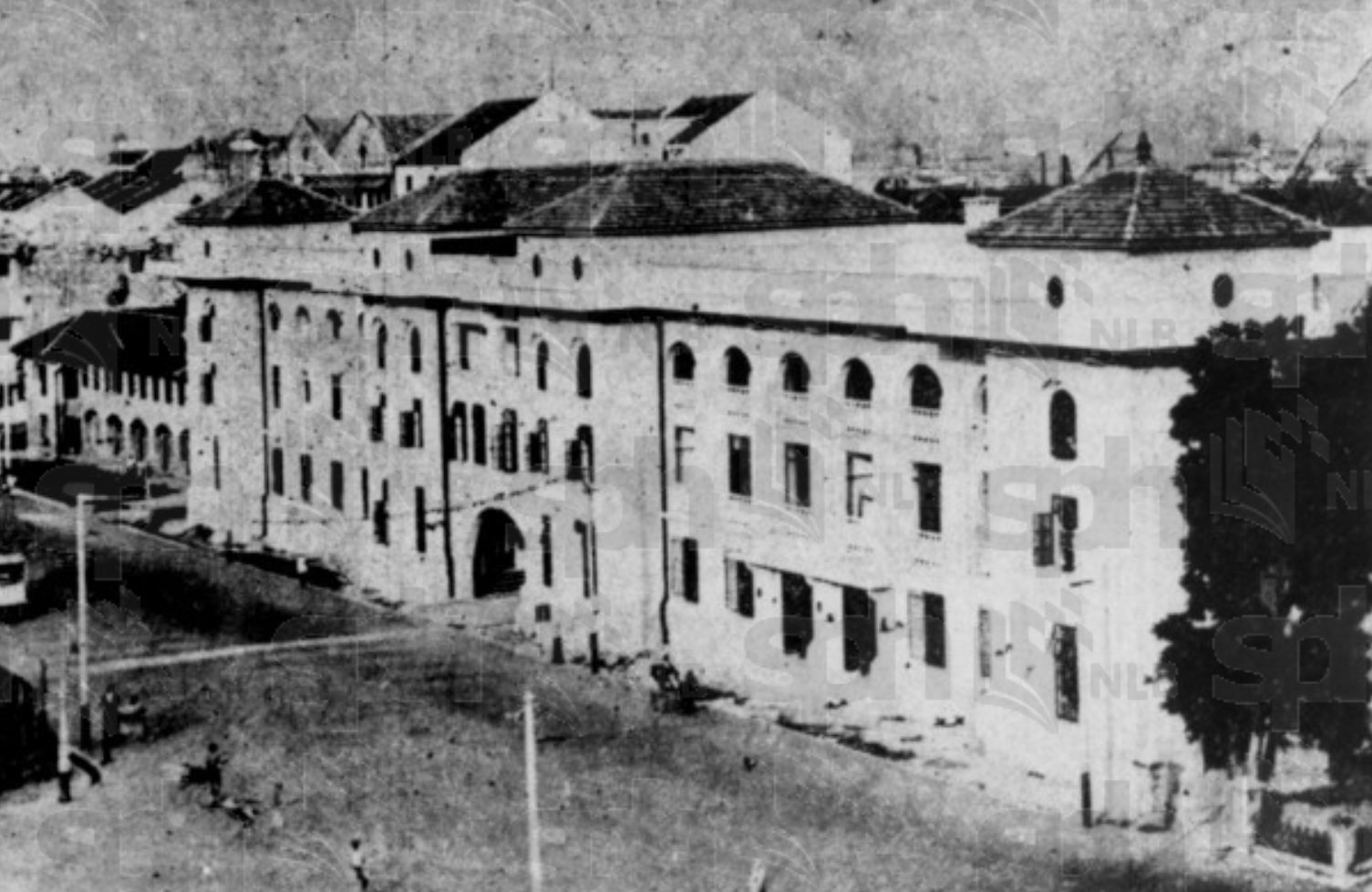
- The building at its completion in 1931
- Interactive map of the Criminal Investigation Department Headquarters area

General information
- Coordinates: 1.2777°N 103.8476°E
- Construction started: July 1930
- Completed: September 1931

Technical details
- Floor count: 3

Design and construction
- Main contractor: Stewart McIntyre

The Criminal Investigation Department Headquarters, initially known as New Detective Station, was a building at the junction of Robinson Road and Cecil Street in the Central Area of Singapore. Completed in 1931, it housed the Singapore Detective Branch, later renamed the Criminal Investigation Department. In 1940, the Special Branch, which later became the Internal Security Department, moved into the building, where it remained until 1976. The Criminal Investigation Department moved elsewhere in 1993, while the building was demolished in 1995 to make way for the Capital Tower.

== Description ==
The three-storey building, which was "hailed as the 'Scotland Yard' of Malaya", featured quarters and courtyards designed to accommodate around 40 detectives, with several facilities such as photographic studios and a criminal registry, as well as jail cells, which were accompanied by an exercise room. The offices could be found on the first storey, along with a "crush" room for visitors, while the upper floors were occupied by the living quarters for the officers stationed at the site and their families.

== History ==
The building's construction had begun by July 1930. It was estimated to cost $388,000, with Stewart McIntyre serving as the contractor. The Singapore Detective Branch, as well as the Chief Police Officer and his staff, who were previously stationed at the Central Police Station, moved into the building, which reportedly cost "over half a million dollars" to build, in September 1931. The living quarters of the European and Asian detective officers were located on the second floor while the living quarters of detectives and their families were located on the first floor. Roots, published by the National Heritage Board, states: "Due to its proximity to Chinatown, many police raids were based out of the CID building as they conducted island-wide cleanup operations against these secret societies and their gang members." In March 1940, the Special Branch moved into the building while the offices of the Inspector-General were to be relocated to the branch's former premises on South Bridge Road. This was to "make for greater co-ordination in the prevention and detection of crime, and secret societies and subversive organisations.

During the Japanese Occupation of Singapore, which lasted from 1942 to 1945, the building was "looted and stripped" of its fittings by the kempeitai, who removed its furniture and "scattered or destroyed" the files of the Criminal Investigation Department and the Special Branch. According to writer Leon Comber, the building "symbolised in many ways the inhumanity and brutality of the Japanese kempeitai and its police supporters." Following the end of the Japanese occupation in August 1945, the Malayan Security Service was headquartered in the building in place of the Special Branch. The service was dissolved in 1948, after which it was replaced by the Special Branch, which began operating out of the building again. It underwent renovations for $10,802 in the following year. In February 1950, metal gates were installed at the building, along with all other police stations in Singapore. The Special Branch, which became the Internal Security Department in 1966, moved to Phoenix Park in 1976. In July 1985, a lighted signboard was placed outside of the building to help people locate the building during the night.

In September 1993, the Criminal Investigation Department moved into the Pearl's Hill Lower Barracks on Eu Tong Sen Street. In July 1995, it was announced that the building would soon be demolished to make way for the Capital Tower, which was to be developed by POSB Bank. The Capitol Tower was completed in 2000. The site at which the building stood was placed on the Police Heritage Trail, which was launched in 2020 to celebrate the 200th anniversary of the Singapore Police Force.
