= National Gallery Singapore =

National museum in Singapore

- Chinese: 新加坡国家美术馆; Malay: Galeri Kebangsaan Singapura; Tamil: சிங்கப்பூர் தேசிய கலைக்கூடம்

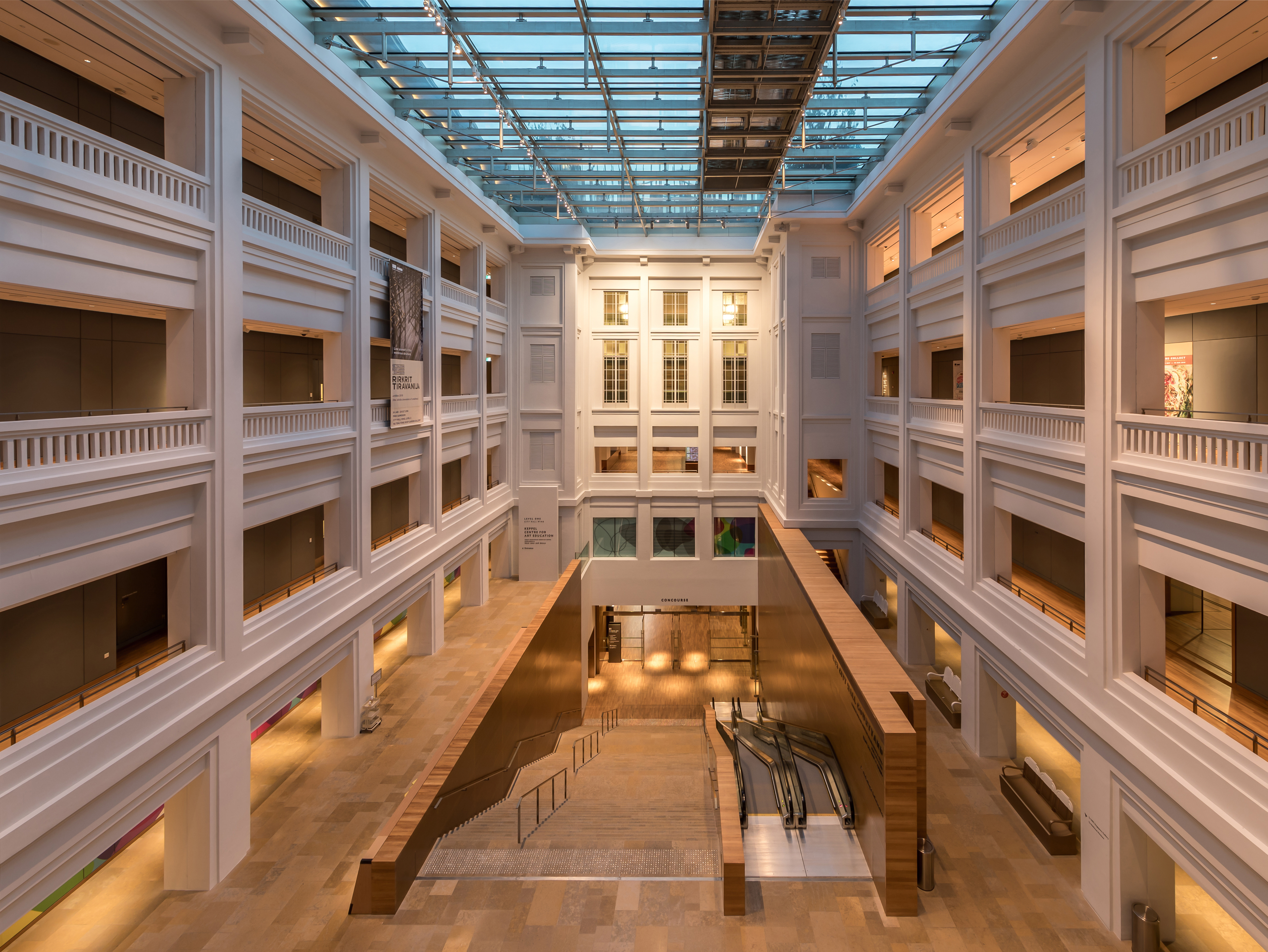
- Interior of the National Gallery of Singapore with airy corridors on 4 levels, staircases, and escalators, in the evening.
- Interactive fullscreen map
- Established: 24 November 2015; 10 years ago
- Location: 1 St. Andrew's Road, Singapore 178957
- Coordinates: 1°17′26″N 103°51′07″E
- Type: Art museum
- Collections: Singaporean and Southeast Asian art
- Collection size: More than 9,000 artworks
- Visitors: 1,979,190 (2024–25)
- Director: Dr Eugene Tan
- Chairperson: Peter Ho
- Architects: studioMilou Singapore; CPG Consultants
- Public transit access: NS25 EW13 City Hall; CC3 Esplanade; NE5 Clarke Quay
- Website: www.nationalgallery.sg

The National Gallery Singapore is a public art museum and national museum located in the Civic District of Singapore. It houses a collection of Singaporean and Southeast Asian art spanning the 19th century to the present, with more than 9,000 artworks.

The Gallery aims to provide an understanding and appreciation of art and culture through a variety of media, focusing on Singapore's culture and heritage and its relationship with other Asian cultures and the world. It consists of two national monuments, the former Supreme Court and former City Hall buildings, and has a combined floor area of 64,000 square metres (690,000 sq ft), making it the largest visual arts venue and largest museum in Singapore. A total cost of approximately S$532 million has gone into the National Gallery Singapore's development.

In financial year 2024-25, the Gallery recorded 1,979,190 visitors. Singapore citizens and permanent residents receive free general admission.

The Gallery also contains several restaurants and cafés, including Odette and National Kitchen by Violet Oon.

== History ==
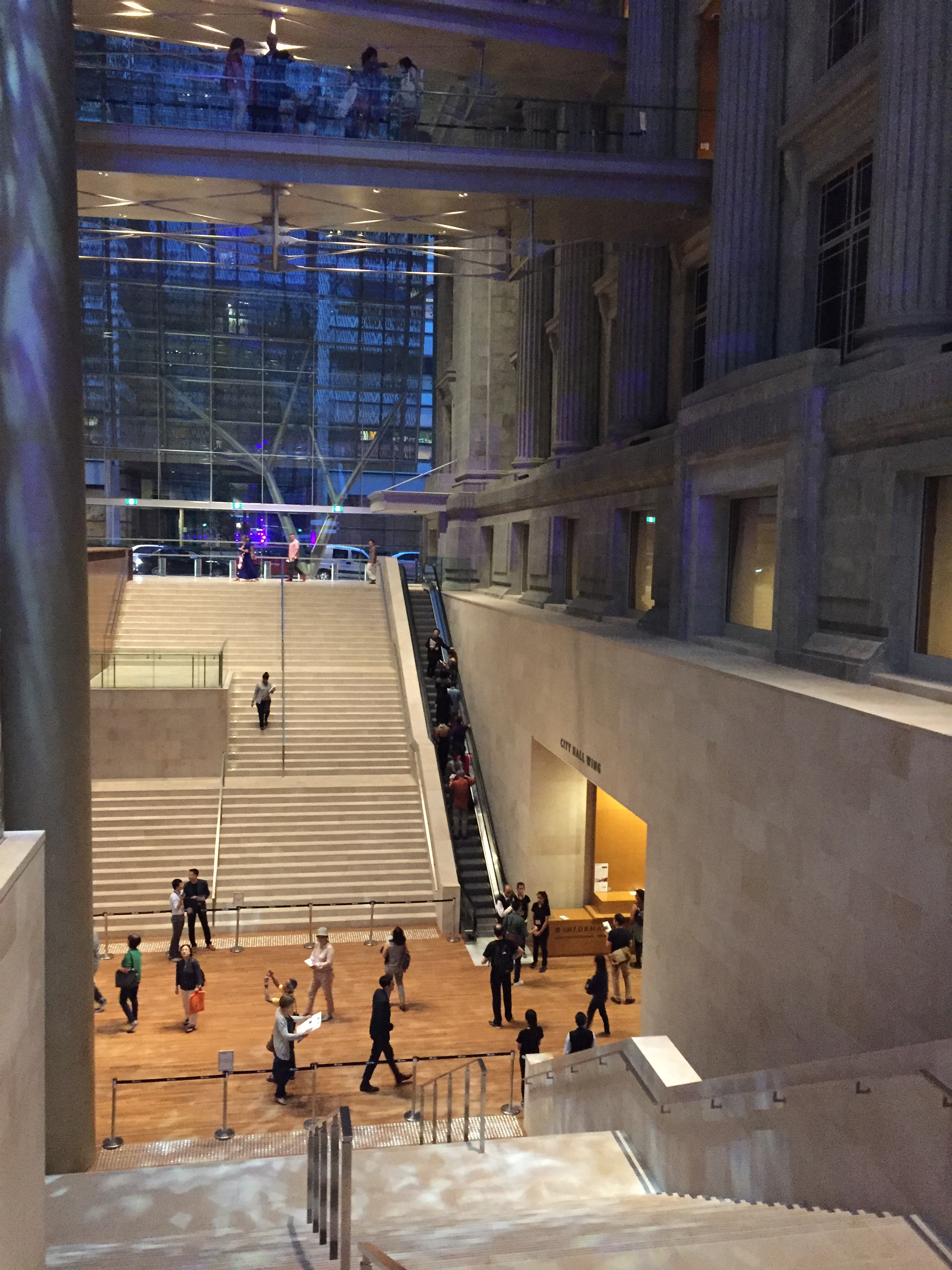
Padang Atrium

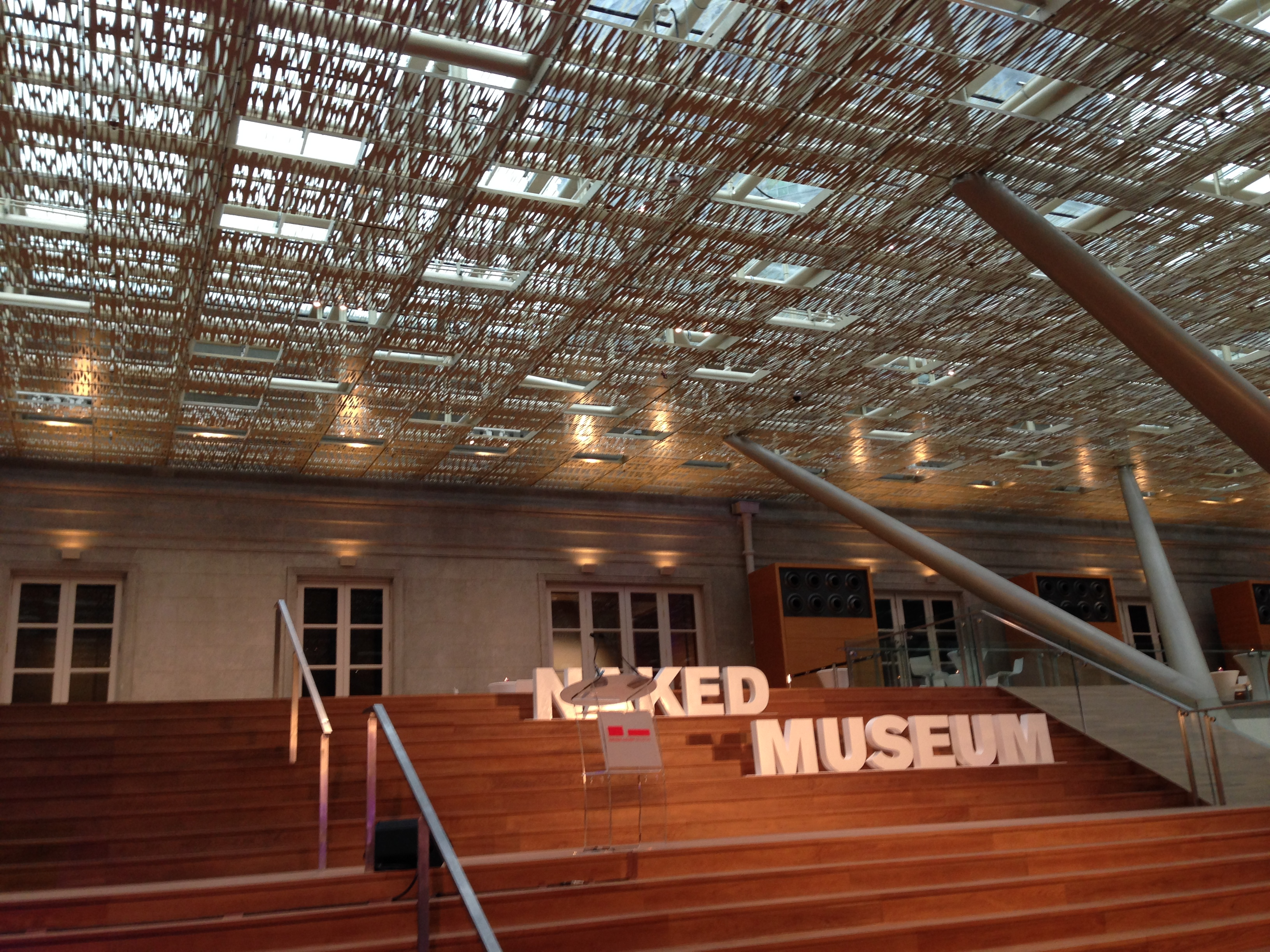
Supreme Court Terrace

=== Planning ===
At his National Day Rally speech on 21 August 2005, Prime Minister Lee Hsien Loong mentioned the government's plan to convert the former Supreme Court building and former City Hall building into a new national gallery. On 2 September 2006, Dr. Lee Boon Yang, Minister for Information, Communications and the Arts officially announced the setting up of the National Gallery Singapore during the Singapore Biennale 2006 at the National Museum of Singapore.

MICA subsequently established a process for stakeholders and interested parties to contribute to the project. A steering committee, initially chaired by Dr. Balaji Sadasivan, oversaw its implementation. The committee was supported by an executive committee and four advisory groups covering museology, architectural conservation, finance, and communications.

=== Design competition ===
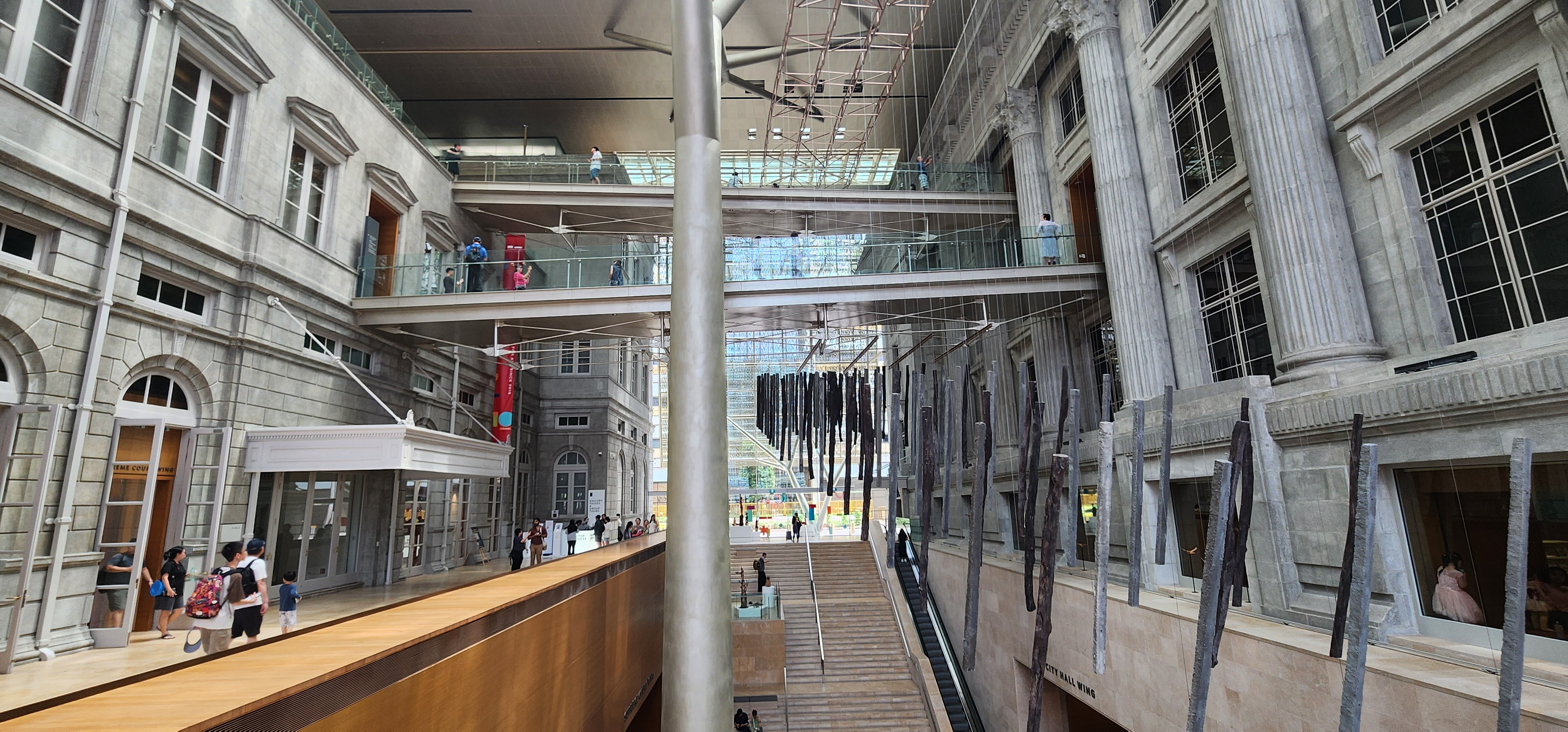
Padang Atrium, with Angin Cloud by Art Labor, a 2025 installation with Jrai wood sculptures.

On 23 February 2007, MICA and the Singapore Institute of Architects launched a two-stage architectural design competition to select a design team for the National Gallery. The first stage called for design and concept proposals and included a site tour of the two buildings. The competition received 111 entries from 29 countries, with five proposals shortlisted in May 2007. Members of the jury consisted of a panel of eminent local and international professionals headed by Tommy Koh, Singapore's Ambassador-at-Large and chairman of the National Heritage Board, and included officials from the Urban Redevelopment Authority, Musée national des Arts asiatiques-Guimet in France and the Asian Civilisations Museum.

For the second stage, the shortlisted candidates had to develop their designs, from which the winning proposal would be selected by the jury. Due to the status of the former Supreme Court Building and City Hall as national monuments, certain aspects of the buildings could not be altered, such as the façade, the Surrender Chamber, the office of Singapore's founding Prime Minister and the panelling in four rooms of the Supreme Court. However, this still left many design options open such as the addition of roof and basement floors. The participants also had to submit entries within a budget of S$320 million.

On 29 August 2007, the seven-member international jury panel named the top three designs out of the five shortlisted. The three firms – Studio Milou Architecture from France, Ho + Hou Architects from Taiwan, and Chan Sau Yan Associates from Singapore – each received $150,000. The jury selected the three designs after reviewing models and digital mock-ups and hearing presentations from the five finalists. The other two firms that were shortlisted in the first stage were DP Architects and Australia's Smart Design Studio.

An exhibition of the five finalists' proposals was held at City Hall in October 2007, and the public was invited to give feedback on the designs, programmes and events. The jury's decision was presented to MICA, which then decided on whom to commission to design and build the art gallery. An announcement on the final design was made in the first quarter of 2008.

=== Competition winner and construction ===
In May 2008, Studio Milou Singapore, in partnership with CPG Consultants (Singapore), was appointed to design and build the Gallery.

Studio Milou Architecture is a French architectural firm, with branches in Paris and Singapore that specialise in the design of museums and cultural spaces.

CPG Consultants, a subsidiary of CPG Corporation, is a multi-disciplinary design consultancy firm. Headquartered in Singapore, CPG Consultants has extensive expertise in conservation and preservation of buildings. To date, the company has completed over 20 such projects in Singapore, most of which are gazetted monuments.

Studio Milou Architecture's design consisted of a linear draped canopy supported by tree-like columns to link the former Supreme Court Building and City Hall at the roof level. The design incorporated an extended staircase linking the basement to the upper levels, making use of solar energy to provide electricity. Fine metal mesh had been proposed to cover most of City Hall. Studio Milou's proposal was ranked first among the three winning designs.

On 21 December 2010, the Gallery appointed Takenaka-Singapore Piling Joint Venture as the main construction contractor for the new Gallery. Construction began in January 2011, and the Gallery opened to the public on 24 November 2015.

== Buildings ==
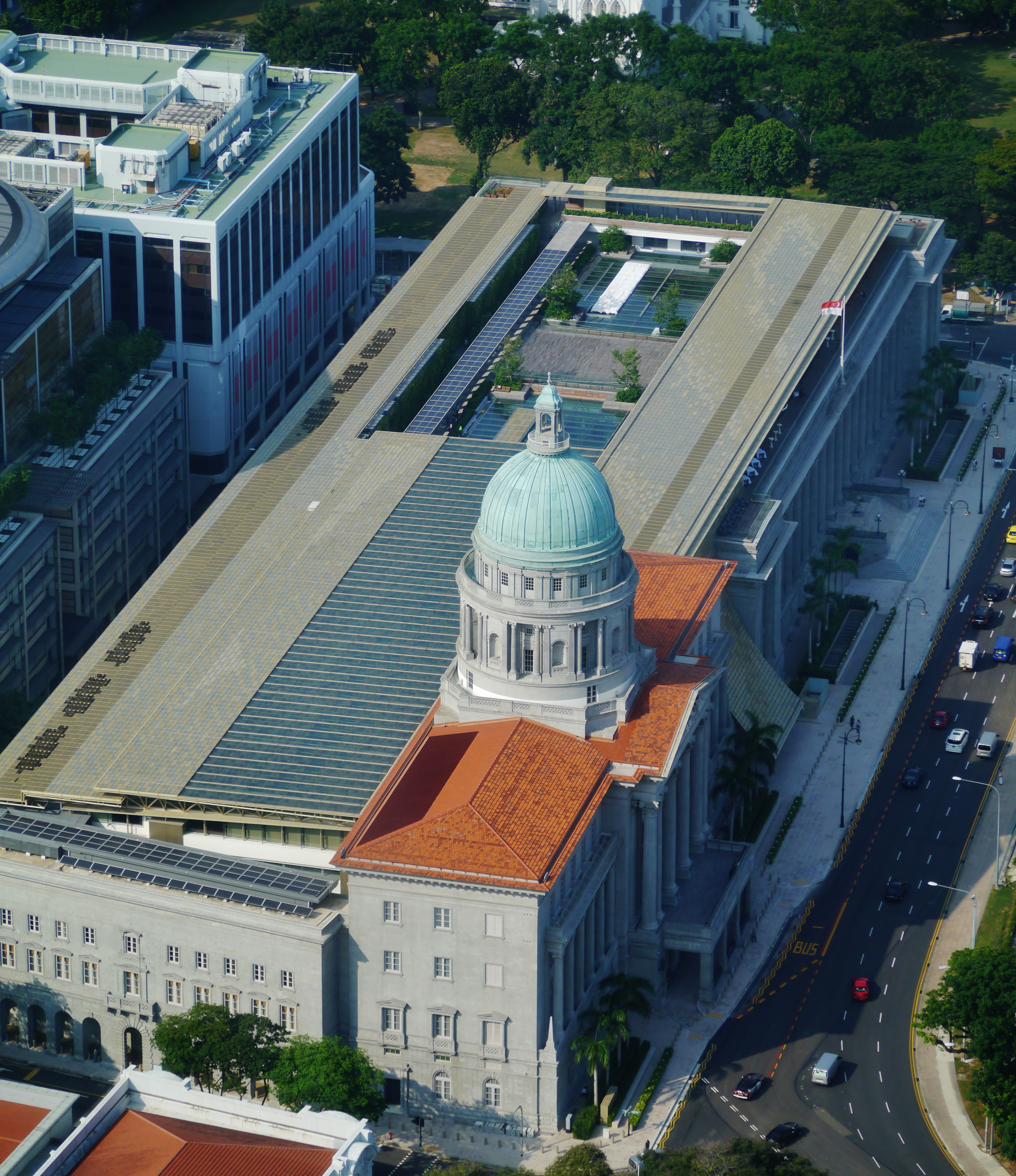
Aerial view

The museum occupies the former Supreme Court Building and City Hall, both of which are national monuments. The buildings face the Padang and are connected by bridges and a new basement level. The design for the National Gallery integrates the City Hall and former Supreme Court buildings, combining both old and new architecture.

The Supreme Court was built on the site of the former Grand Hotel de l'Europe, which was demolished in 1936. Designed by Frank Dorrington Ward, Chief Architect of the Public Works Department, the former Supreme Court building was built to house Supreme Court offices and courtrooms and was declared open on 3 August 1939. This building is the former courthouse of the Supreme Court of Singapore, before it moved into the new building on 20 June 2005. The architecture of the former Supreme Court building is in harmony with that of its neighbour, City Hall. The general layout of the building exemplifies British colonial architecture, comprising four blocks of offices and courtrooms surrounding a central rotunda with a dome that was originally used to house a circular law library. United Engineers Ltd was the building contractor. The Corinthian and Ionic columns, sculptures and relief panels were the works of Italian artist, Cavaliere Rudolfo Nolli. The building also features tympanum sculptures and ornamented frieze panels.

The City Hall building was constructed between 1926 and 1929 and was originally known as the Municipal Building. Designed by the British Municipal architects A. Gordon and S. D. Meadows, it was used to house the offices of the Municipal Council, which was responsible for the provision of water, electricity, gas, roads, bridges and street lighting. From 1963 to 1991, City Hall came to house offices of several government departments and courtrooms. The building was vacated in 2006. It was in the City Hall building that Admiral Lord Louis Mountbatten, on behalf of the Allied forces, accepted the surrender of the Japanese forces on 12 September 1945.

The building also housed the office of Lee Kuan Yew, the first prime minister of Singapore. Lee and members of his Cabinet took their Oaths of Allegiance and Oaths of Office on 5 June 1959 in the City Hall Chamber. It was gazetted on 14 February 1992 as a national monument. The original layout of City Hall is a typical example of neoclassical British architecture. The building's interior is modestly proportioned, but its front façade is distinguished by 18 three-storey-high Corinthian columns facing the Padang.

== Galleries ==
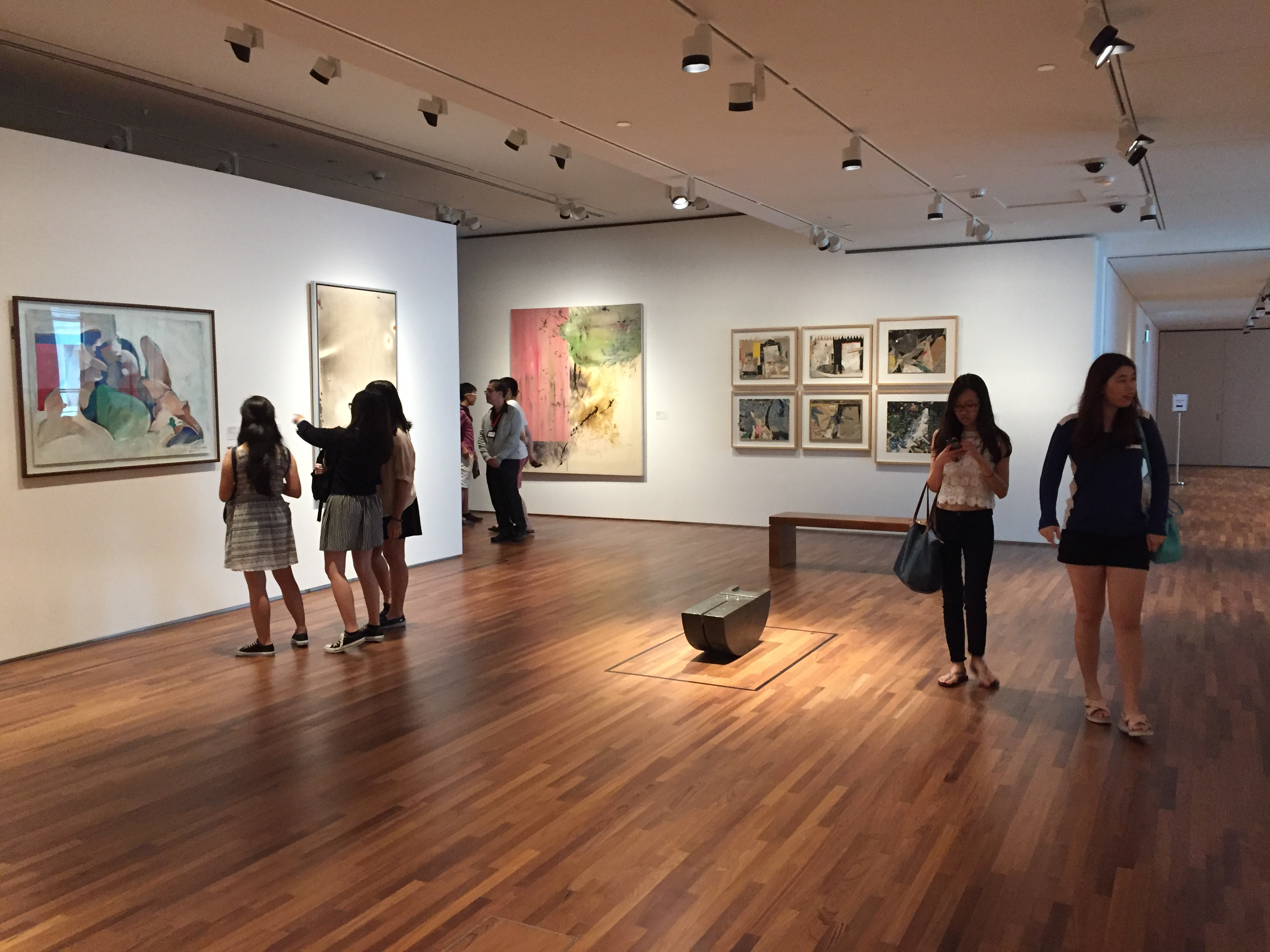
A gallery on the second floor

National Gallery Singapore focuses on Singaporean and Southeast Asian art from the 19th century to the present. Its displays draw primarily from Singapore's National Collection and include works by artists from Singapore and other parts of Southeast Asia.

The Gallery's collection forms part of Singapore's National Collection. Its origins can be traced to artworks donated by Dato Loke Wan Tho to Singapore in 1960 and subsequent years.

The Gallery mainly draws from Singapore's National Collection, the world's largest public collection of modern and contemporary Southeast Asian art. The National Collection started with an original bequest of 93 works made to the National Museum in 1976, by the well-known cinema magnate and art patron, Dato Loke Wan Tho. Through careful nurturing over the years, this collection has grown significantly to approximately 8,000 pieces in 2010. The National Heritage Board is presently the custodian of this collection. National Gallery Singapore will feature works by major Singaporean artists such as Georgette Chen, Chen Chong Swee, Chen Wen Hsi, Cheong Soo Pieng, and Liu Kang. The collection now spans from early-20th-century naturalistic paintings to contemporary video installations. The collection also holds pieces from Southeast Asian artists of international standing, such as Affandi (Indonesia), Latiff Mohidin (Malaysia), Le Pho (Vietnam), Montien Boonma (Thailand), Fernando Cueto Amorsolo (Philippines), and Raden Saleh (Indonesia).

=== Singapore Gallery ===
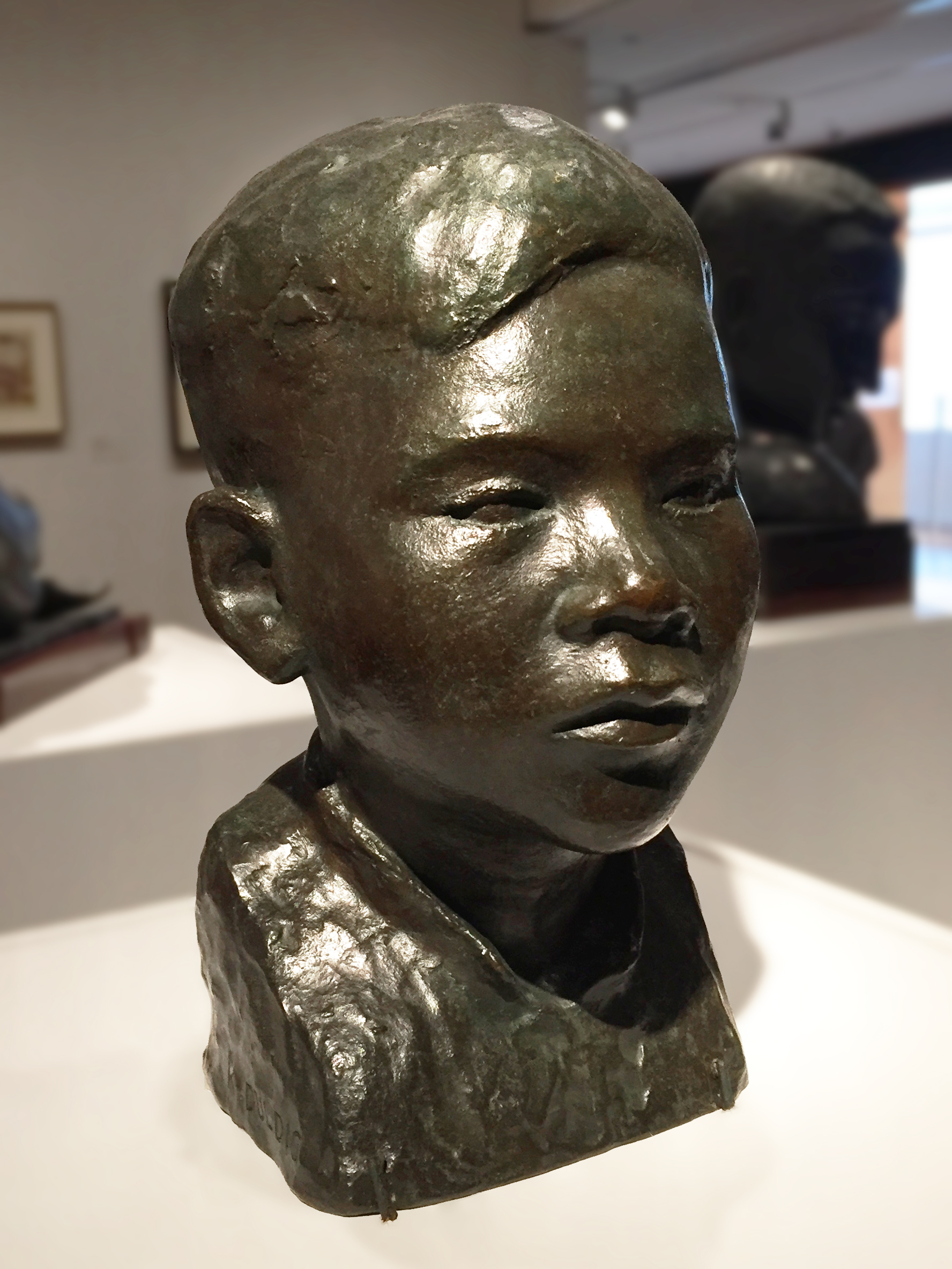
Malay Boy (1939) by Karl Duldig, National Gallery Singapore

The Singapore Gallery is a platform for studying and presenting the cultural and aesthetic identity of Singapore from the ancient period to present day.

=== Southeast Asia Gallery ===
Housed in the former Supreme Court building, the Southeast Asia Gallery presents the history of Southeast Asian art, starting in the 19th century.

=== Special set of Research Galleries ===
These galleries complement the core galleries, providing space for curators and researchers to experiment with ways of presenting materials from the Gallery's permanent collection.

=== Changing gallery spaces ===
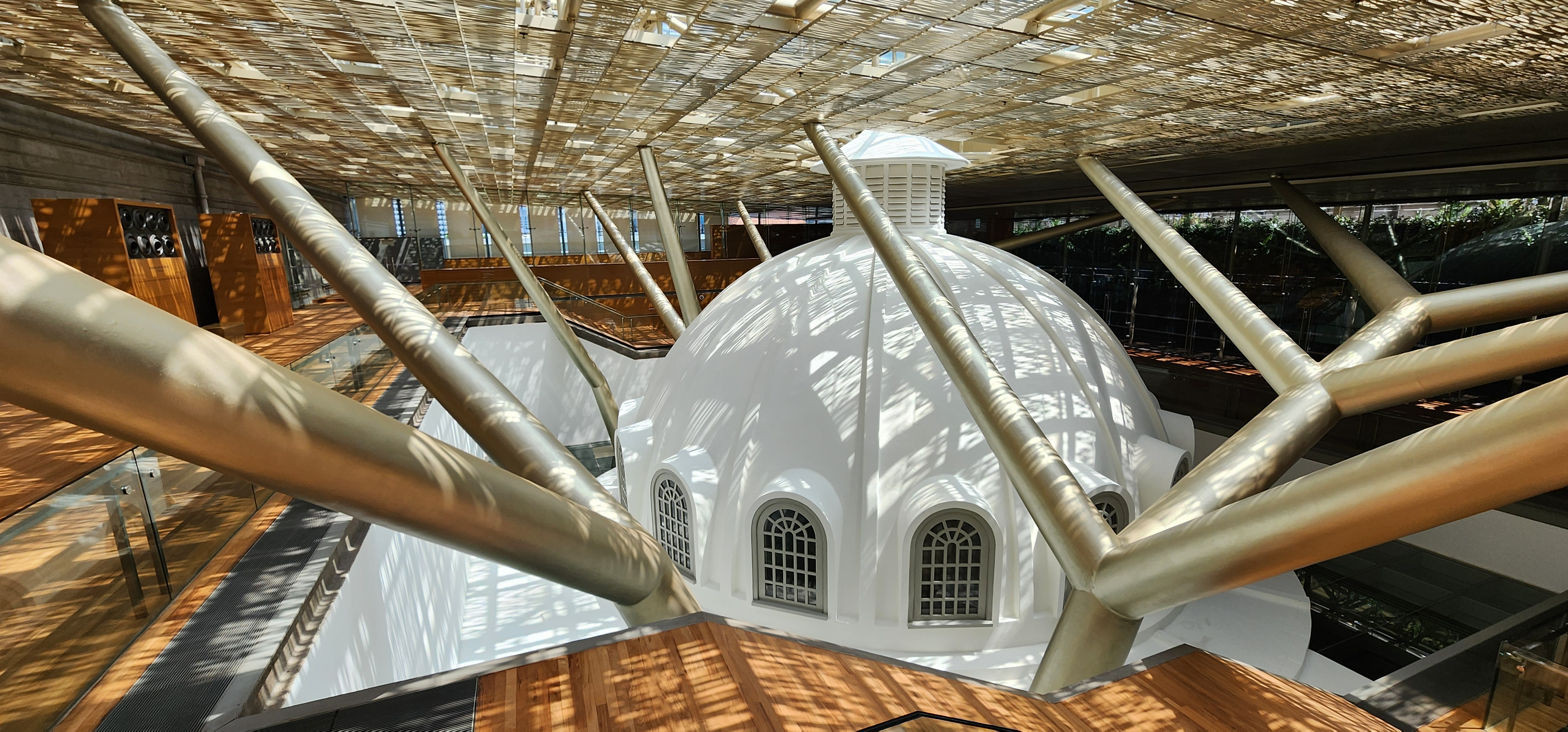
Upper level above the dome.

The gallery has approximately 6,000 square metres (65,000 sq ft) of spaces to host international travelling exhibitions.

=== Docents ===
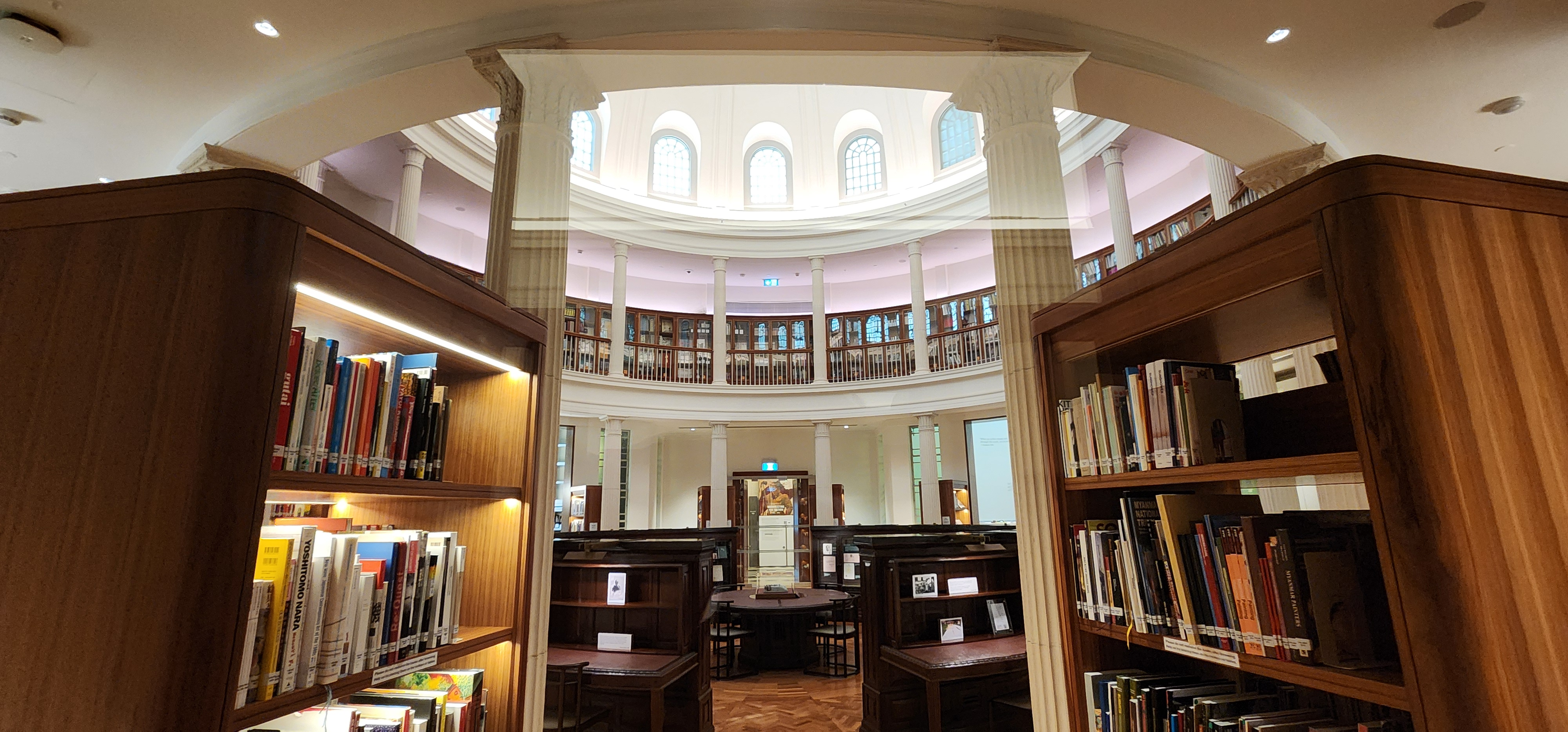
The rotunda.

One of the public programmes offered by the Gallery is the Docent Programme, a training workshop in art, history and culture. The programme seeks to cultivate a pool of volunteer guides. They are trained in public speaking and have extensive knowledge of Singaporean and Southeast Asian art, and the architecture and history of the Gallery buildings.

== Keppel Centre for art education ==
The Keppel Centre for Art Education is a learning facility for families and schools. It provides spaces and programmes for children and students to engage with art.

Children and younger students will experience and interact with original artworks that are specially created to develop observation skills and tactile exploration.

The Keppel Centre for Art Education also offers programmes including a regular series of Studio-based workshops, artist talks, curator's presentations, as well as complimentary Drop-in programmes conducted by artists, curators and museum educators.

== Exhibitions at the National Gallery Singapore ==
An exhibition, ''The Gift'', was held from 20 August to 9 November 2021 and explored the role of gifts in art-making and collecting. It was a partnership with three other arts institutions: Galeri Nasional Indonesia, MAIIAM Contemporary Art Museum in Thailand and Nationalgalerie – Staatliche Museen zu Berlin, which was initiated by the Goethe Institut. Each museum curated a selection of works from their own and each other's collections that were on display simultaneously.

In 2022, the Gallery presented ''Ever Present: First Peoples Art of Australia'', which surveyed historical and contemporary works by more than 150 Aboriginal and Torres Strait Islander artists.

Exhibition	Artist	Exhibition period
The Gift	Various	20 August 2021 – 9 November 2021

== Exhibitions held at the Singapore Art Museum ==
Before the National Gallery opened, it presented exhibitions at the Singapore Art Museum and other venues. These exhibitions include:

Exhibition	Artist	Exhibition period
In/sight: Abstract Art by Wu Guanzhong and Artists from Southeast Asia	Wu Guanzhong and various artists	17 August 2013 – 30 April 2014
Seeing the Kite Again Series II	Wu Guanzhong	3 May 2012 – 5 May 2013
Liu Kang: A Centennial Celebration	Liu Kang	29 July 2011 – 16 October 2011
Notable Acquisitions Exhibition	Various	Works by Tan Oe Pang: 18 April 2011 – 5 February 2012 Works by Arthur Yap, Tay Chee Toh & Chia Wai Hon: 7 December 2010 – 27 March 2011
In memory of Wu Guanzhong: Seeing the Kites Again	Wu Guanzhong	14 December 2009 – 1 May 2011
Cheong Soo Pieng: Bridging Worlds	Cheong Soo Pieng	15 September 2010 – 26 December 2010
The Story of Yeh Chi Wei	Yeh Chi Wei	27 May 2010 – 12 September 2010
Realism in Asian Art	Various	9 April 2010 – 4 July 2010

== Travelling shows and artworks ==
Apart from displays within Singapore, the National Collection has also travelled to international museums and exhibition venues in the Americas, Europe and Asia.

Exhibition	Venue	Period	Works travelled
Andy Warhol: 15 Minutes Eternal	Art Science Museum	17 March to 12 August 2012	Redza Piyadasa, 1991, Seated Malay Girl, mixed media on paper, 33 x 65 cm, collection of the National Heritage Board
The Birth and Development of Singapore Art	Fukuoka Asian Art Museum	29 March to 26 June 2012	Selected artworks by Singapore artists Lim Hak Tai and Cheong Soo Pieng
East Meets West – The Exhibition of Wu Guangzhong's Paintings	Zhejiang Art Museum	20 November to 25 December 2010	76 artworks from the exhibition hailed from the National Heritage Board Singapore's collection. Singapore's contribution of Wu's works was the second largest amongst the eight participating art institutions.

== Poetry residency ==
The Gallery has had three poets-in-residence:

2017–18: Madeleine Lee, with poems from her residency published by the Gallery in the book, regarding (2018).

2018–19: Edwin Thumboo, with poems in the book, Ayatana (2020).

2021–22: Koh, Buck Song, with poems and haiga artworks in the book, the world anew: Poetry And Haiga Inspired By Art In Pandemic Times (2023).

== In popular culture ==
- The gallery is featured in HBO series Westworld, as part of the third season.
- The music video of "Don't Say You Love Me" (2025) by South Korean singer Jin features several areas in the gallery, such as the Padang Atrium, Lower Link Bridge, Supreme Court Foyer and the permanent exhibition hall, "Between Declarations and Dreams: Art of Southeast Asia Since the 19th Century". A painting from the latter, Boschbrand (Forest Fire) by Raden Saleh (1849), also appears in the thumbnail and in several scenes. The music video was shot in partnership with the Singapore Tourism Board.

== Gallery ==
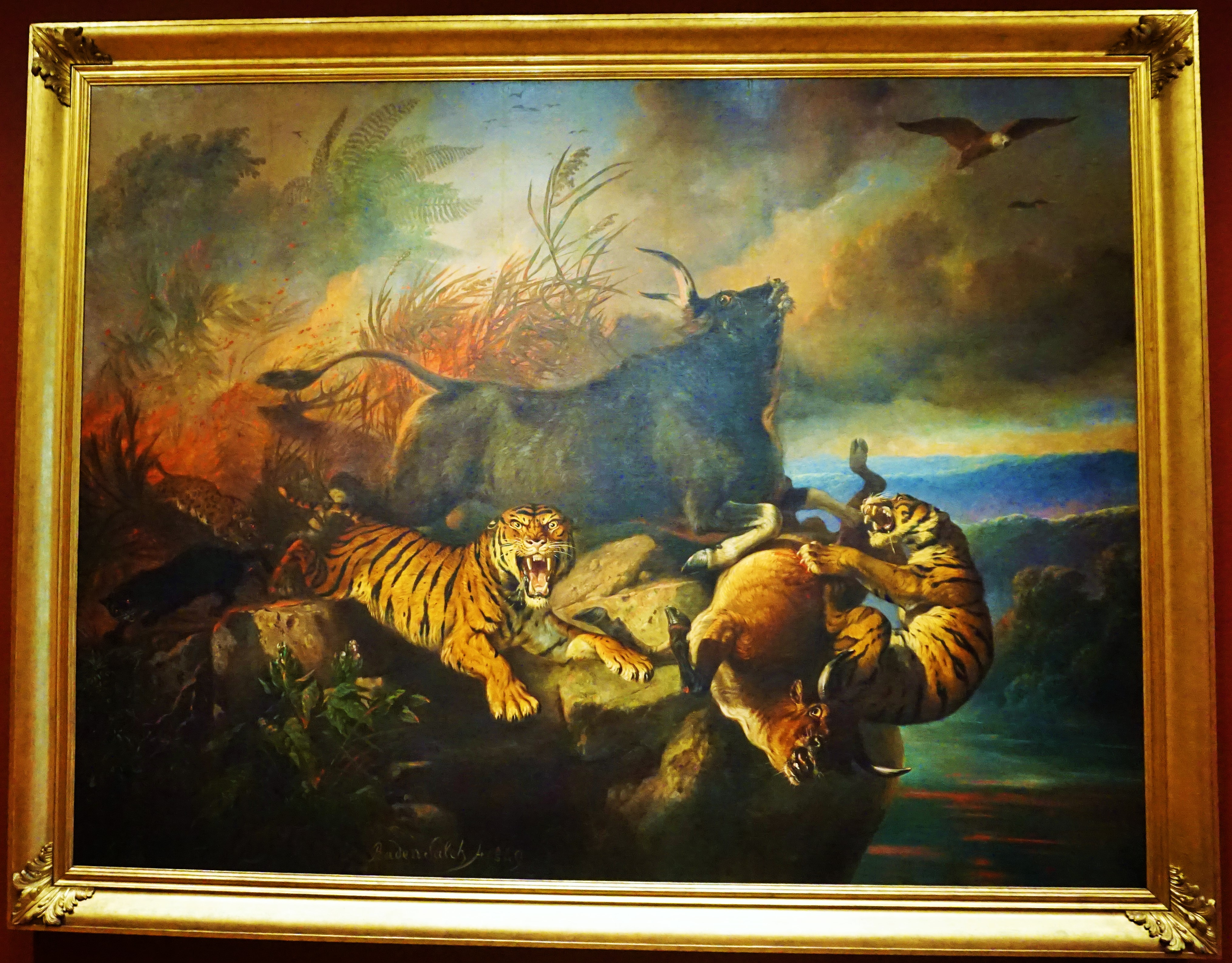
Raden Saleh, Boschbrand (Forest Fire), 1849, Oil on canvas

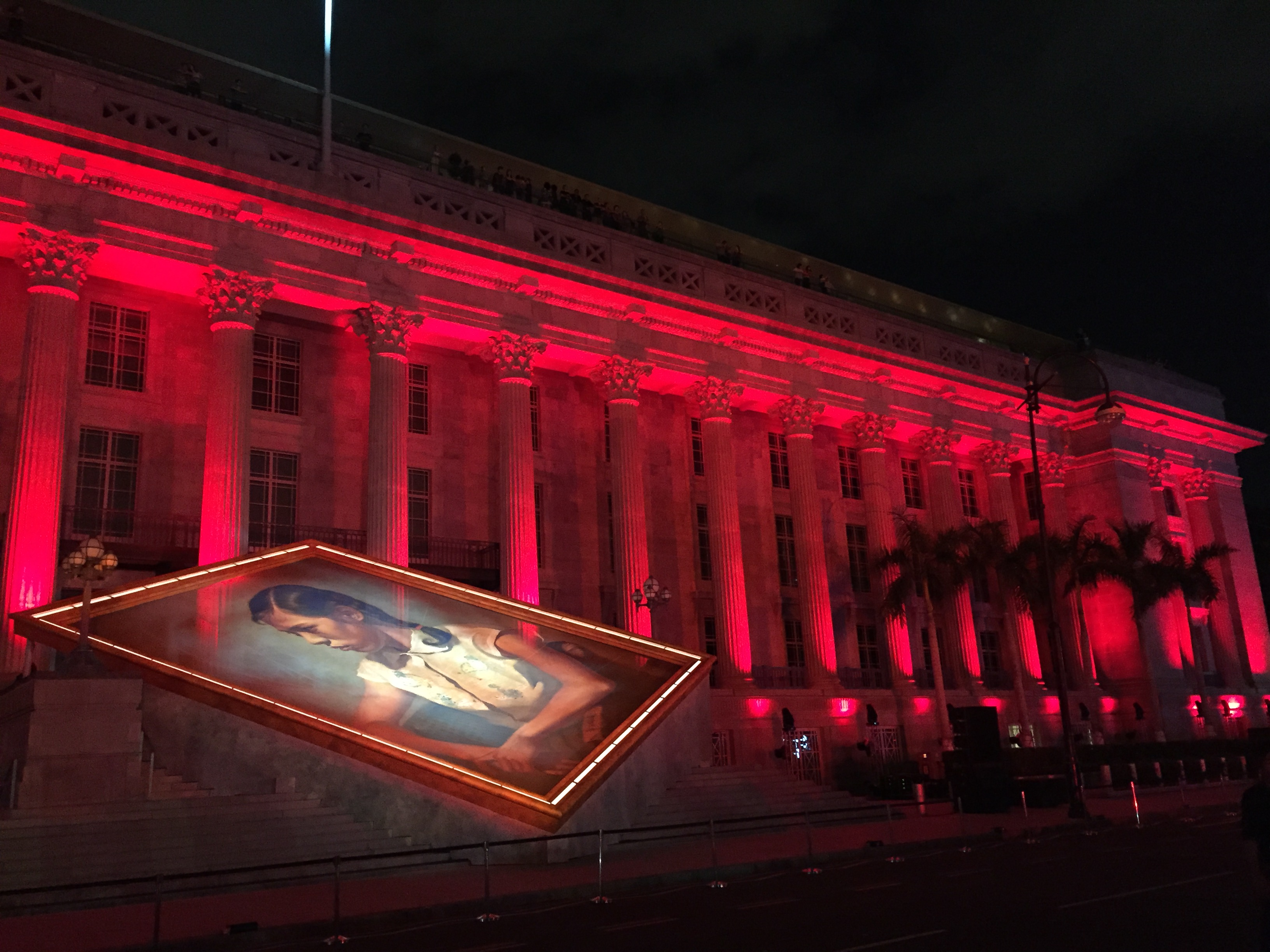
The Hope façade show, 2015

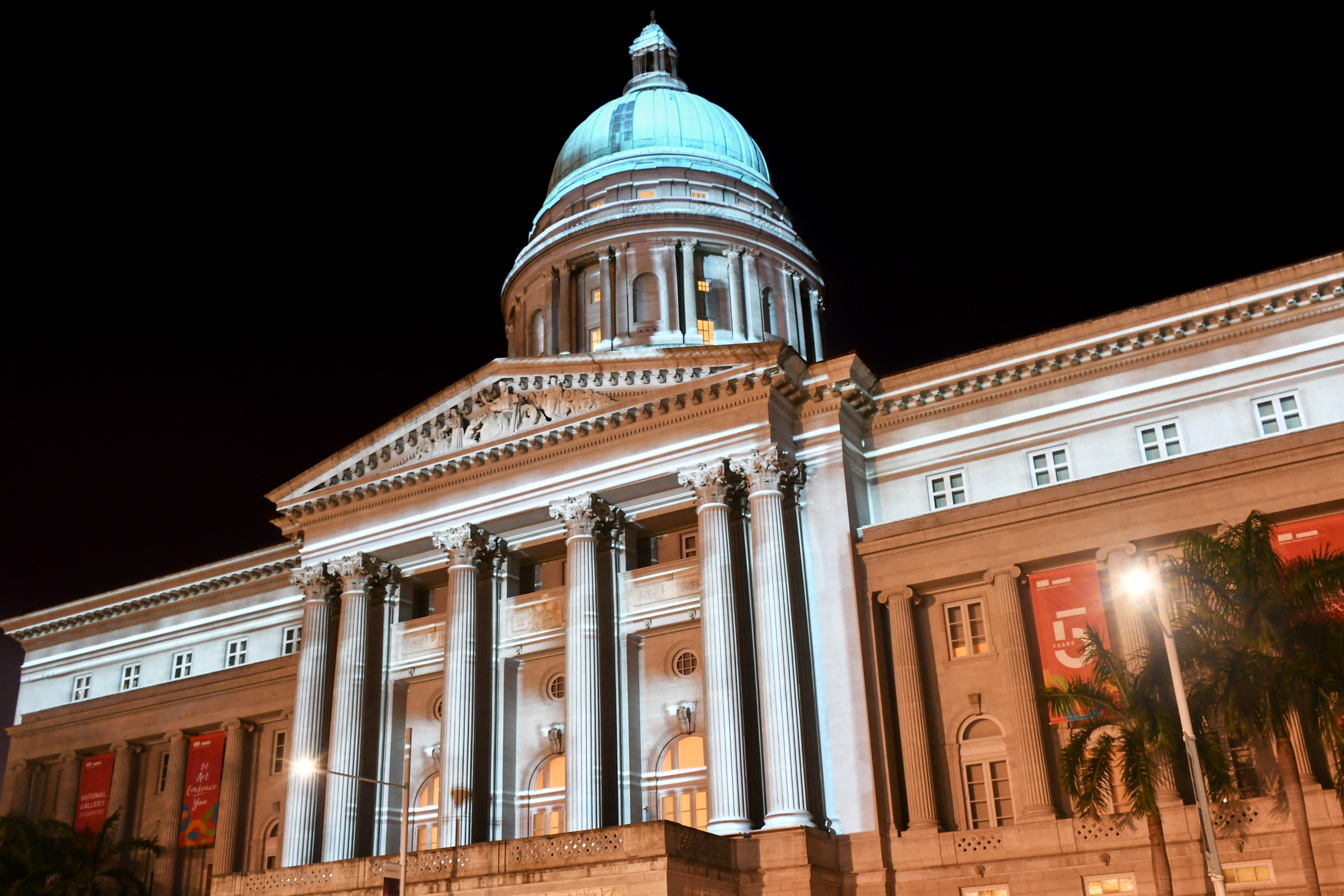
Illuminated Supreme Court Wing façade during Light to Night Festival 2021.

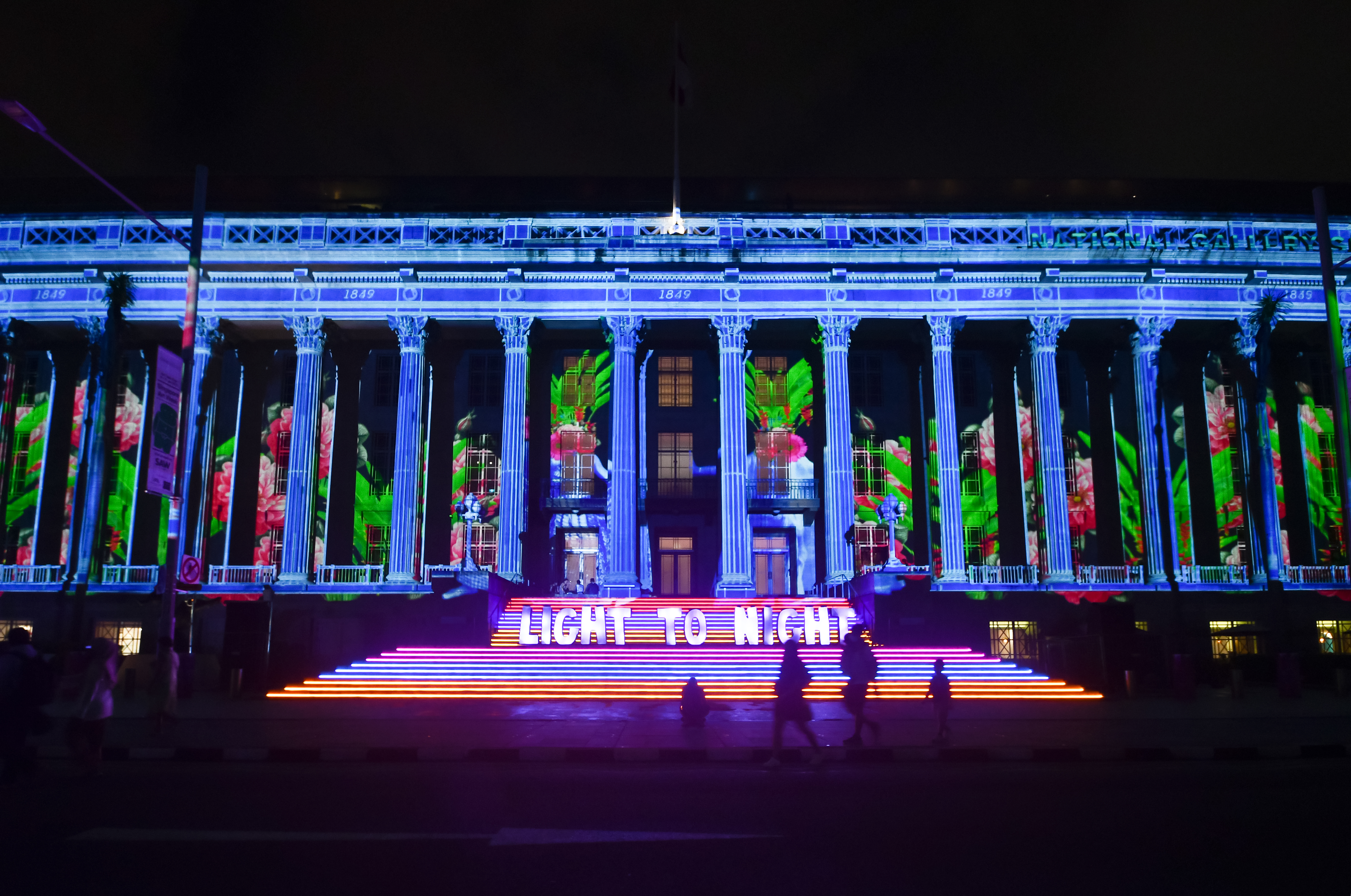
Illuminated City Hall Wing façade during Light to Night Festival 2023.

== Controversies ==
The museum staged its first-ever R18-rated exhibition, "Passion is Volcanic: Desire in Southeast Asian Art", running from April 24 to August 30, 2026. The exhibition marks the first time in its history that an exhibition was restricted with a R18 rating by the Infocomm Media Development Authority (IMDA), Singapore. It had to follow strict guidelines including no photography and videography is allowed within the exhibition space. There was evidence to suggest that the show experienced redtape beyond its rating with sources noting that the show was delayed from its plan launched in January 2026.

In the same year in April 2026, less than a month before opening on 22 May 2026, an exhibition "After The Monsoon: Art & War In Southeast Asia" was postponed indefinitely “out of consideration for the uncertain global situation”. It was noted that the exhibition delay was unexpected as advertising materials around the gallery had already been set-up with a number of international media already listing the exhibition. The exhibition was a centred around the theme of war, it examines how artists Southeast Asia make sense of famine, death and destruction in the preceding years after the Second World War and Vietnam war. There has been no specific source citing if this was due to any specific artwork or themes explored.

In August 2026, a new exhibition "Art Remembers" featuring similar artists and the exact same curatorial panel was released. The exhibition site was also identical to the one slated for use for "After The Monsoon: Art & War In Southeast Asia". The gallery noted that this was a completely individual stand alone exhibition despite the many similarities. However, an Instagram post by Sim Chi Yin, an artist featured in both exhibitions features the exact same work "Interventions: Farming".

== See also ==
- List of national galleries
- List of largest art museums
- National Heritage Board (Singapore)
- Singapore Art Museum
- National Museum of Singapore

== Bibliography ==
- National Art Gallery, Singapore, 2009. Light & Movement Portrayed: The Art of Anthony Poon. ISBN 978-981-08-3545-3
- Yeo Wei Wei (editor), 2010. Realism in Asia Volume One. National Art Gallery, Singapore. ISBN 978-981-08-5349-5
- National Art Gallery, Singapore, 2010. The Story of Yeh Chi Wei. ISBN 978-981-08-5026-5
- Grace Tng, Seng Yu Jin & Yeo Wei Wei, 2010. Cheong Soo Pieng: Visions of Southeast Asia. National Art Gallery, Singapore. ISBN 978-981-08-6422-4
- Yeo Wei Wei & Ye Shufang, 2010. Salted Fish. National Art Gallery, Singapore. ISBN 978-981-08-6444-6
- National Art Gallery, Singapore, 2010. When I Grow Up I Want to Paint Like Cheong Soo Pieng (CSP Colouring Book). ISBN 978-981-08-6888-8
- Sara Siew (ed), 2011. Liu Kang: Essays on Art and Culture. National Art Gallery, Singapore. ISBN 978-981-08-7675-3
- Yeo Wei Wei (ed), 2011. Asian Artists Series – Liu Kang: Colourful Modernist. National Art Gallery, Singapore. ISBN 978-981-08-8675-2
- National Art Gallery, Singapore, 2011. When I Grow Up I Want to Paint Like Liu Kang. ISBN 978-981-08-7997-6
- Natalie Hennedige, 2012. Koko The Great. National Art Gallery, Singapore. ISBN 978-981-08-8758-2
- Ho Lee- Ling, 2013. Who is Cheong Soo Pieng? National Art Gallery, Singapore. ISBN 978-981-07-5678-9
- Sara Siew, 2013. Awesome Art. National Art Gallery, Singapore. ISBN 978-981-07-4372-7
- Mechtild Widrich, 2016. The Naked Museum. The Naked Museum: Art, Urbanism, and Global Positioning in Singapore, Art Journal, 75:2, 46–65.
