= Former Supreme Court, Singapore =

Monumental building in Singapore

Coordinates: 1°17′23″N 103°51′04.5″E

Former Supreme Court
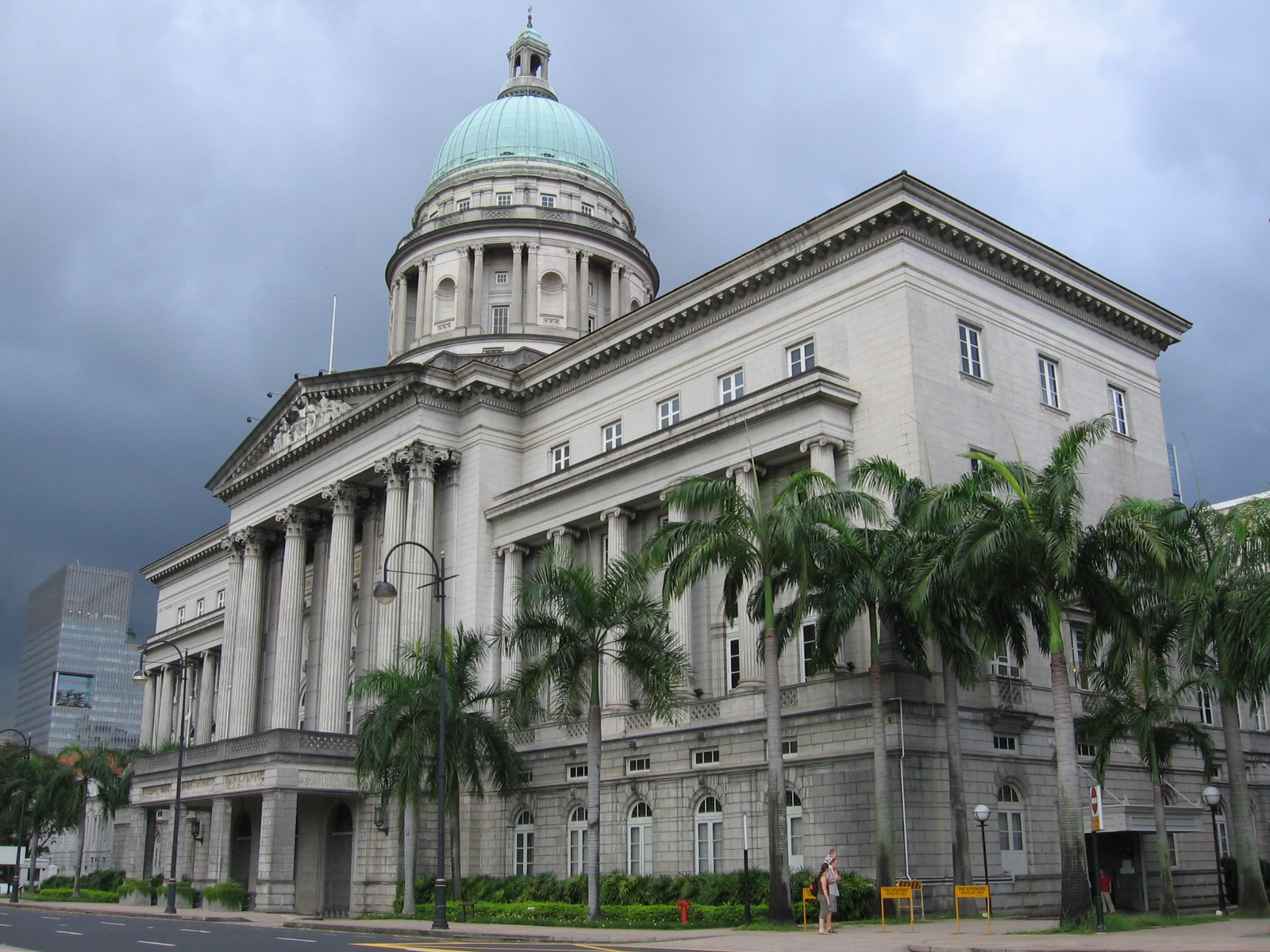
- Former names: Supreme Court
- Alternative names: Old Supreme Court

General information
- Status: Occupied
- Type: Court
- Architectural style: Baroque Revival, Neoclassical
- Classification: B
- Location: Singapore, 1 St Andrew's Road, Singapore 178958, Singapore, Singapore
- Current tenants: National Gallery Singapore
- Groundbreaking: 1 April 1937
- Construction started: April 1937
- Completed: 1939
- Opened: 3 August 1939
- Closed: 2011
- Affiliation: National Heritage Board

Technical details
- Floor area: 5,110 m^{2} (55,000 sq ft)

Design and construction
- Architect: Frank Dorrington Ward
- Architecture firm: Public Works Department
- Other designers: Rudolfo Nolli; Augusto Martelli
- Main contractor: United Engineers

National monument of Singapore
- Designated: 14 February 1992; 34 years ago
- Reference no.: 28

The Former Supreme Court building (Malay: Bangunan Mahkamah Agung Lama, Chinese: 最高法院大厦) is the former courthouse of the Supreme Court of Singapore. Opened in 1939, the building was the last structure built in the style of classical architecture in the former British colony. On 20 June 2005, the Supreme Court moved to its current premises at 1 Supreme Court Lane, located behind the Former Supreme Court.

Since 24 November 2015, the Former Supreme Court, combined with the Former City Hall, serves as the location of the National Gallery Singapore.

== History ==
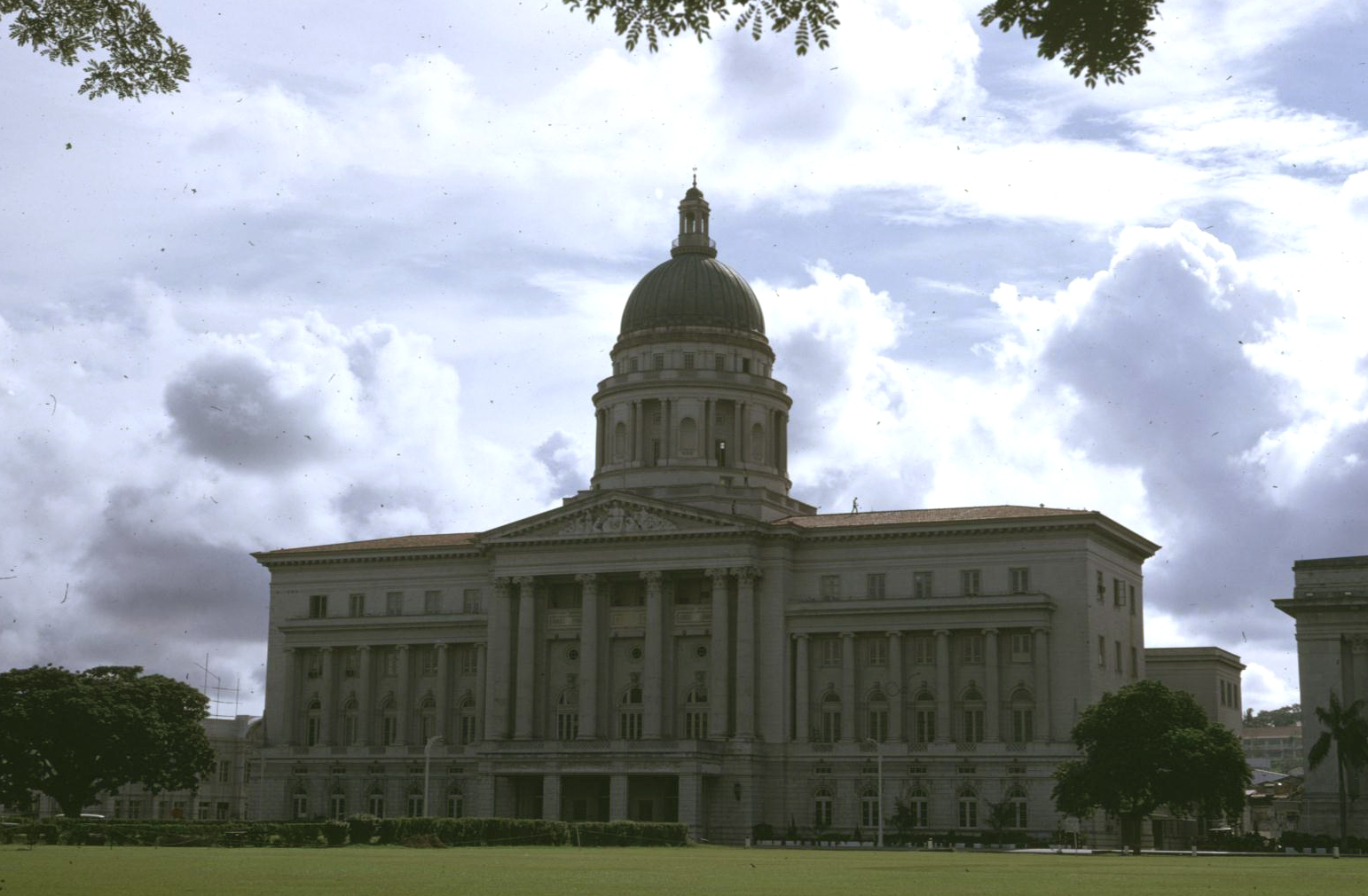
The Supreme Court building c. 1970.

On 1 April 1937, Sir Shenton Whitelegge Thomas, Governor of the Straits Settlements laid the original foundation stone of the Supreme Court Building. (At the time it was the largest foundation stone in the whole of Malaya.) Buried beneath the stone is a time capsule containing six Singaporean newspapers dated 31 March 1937, and a handful of coins of the Straits Settlements. The capsule is not due to be retrieved until the year 3000.

The Supreme Court building was declared open on 3 August 1939 by Sir Shenton Thomas and handed over to the Chief Justice, Sir Percy McElwaine, on the same day.

In 1946, after World War II, the building was the site of war crime trials of members of the Imperial Japanese Army for actions in Singapore during the war.

After the court moved to a new building, the Former Supreme Court Building, together with the adjacent Former City Hall, was converted into use as the National Gallery Singapore, which opened in 2015.

== Architecture and design ==
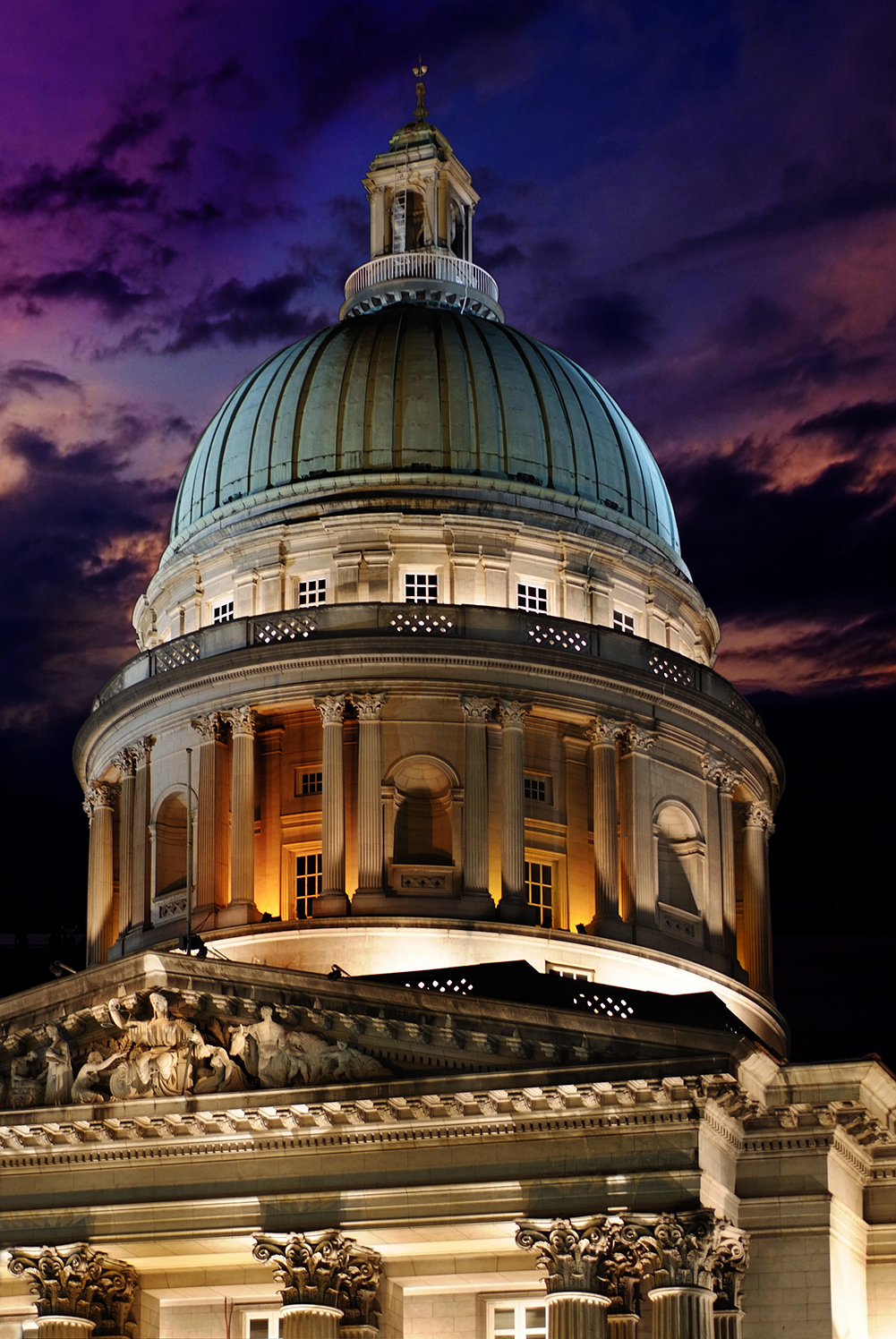
Dome of the old Supreme Court Building at night (2011)

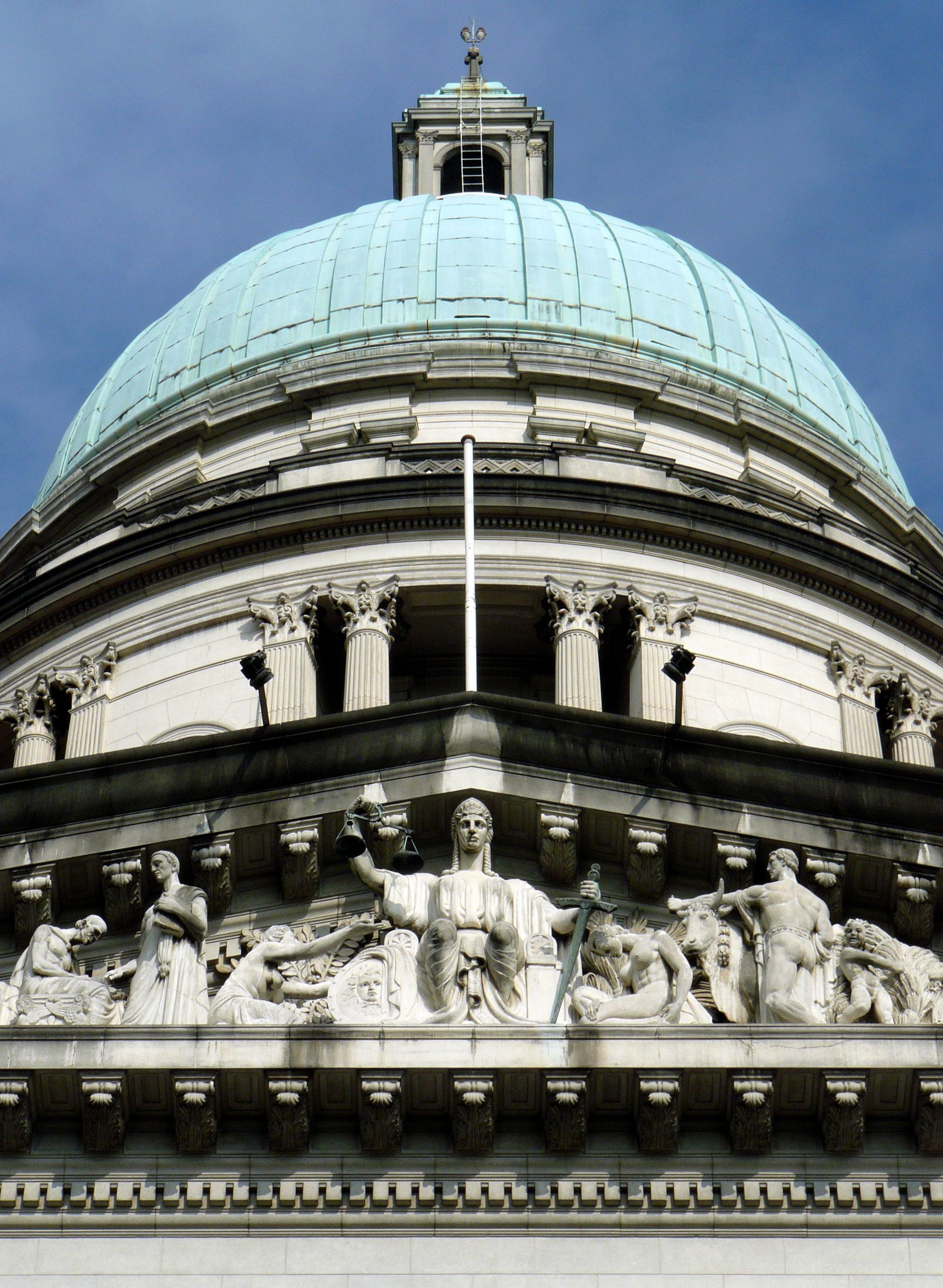
The allegory of justice is visible below the cupola

The Former Singapore Supreme Court building was designed by Frank Dorrington Ward and built by United Engineers. It was built in front of the Padang grounds between 1937 and 1939.

== See also ==
- Supreme Court, Singapore
- City Hall MRT station

== Notes ==
- Ho, Weng Hin (2008), The Former Supreme Court of Singapore & its Artificial Stone: Documentation, Analysis & Conservation Guidelines for a National Monument, Genoa: unpublished thesis, School of Specialization in Restoration of Monuments, University of Genoa, OCLC 233929838.
- History of Supreme Court
