= Peter Zec =

German design consultant (born 1956)

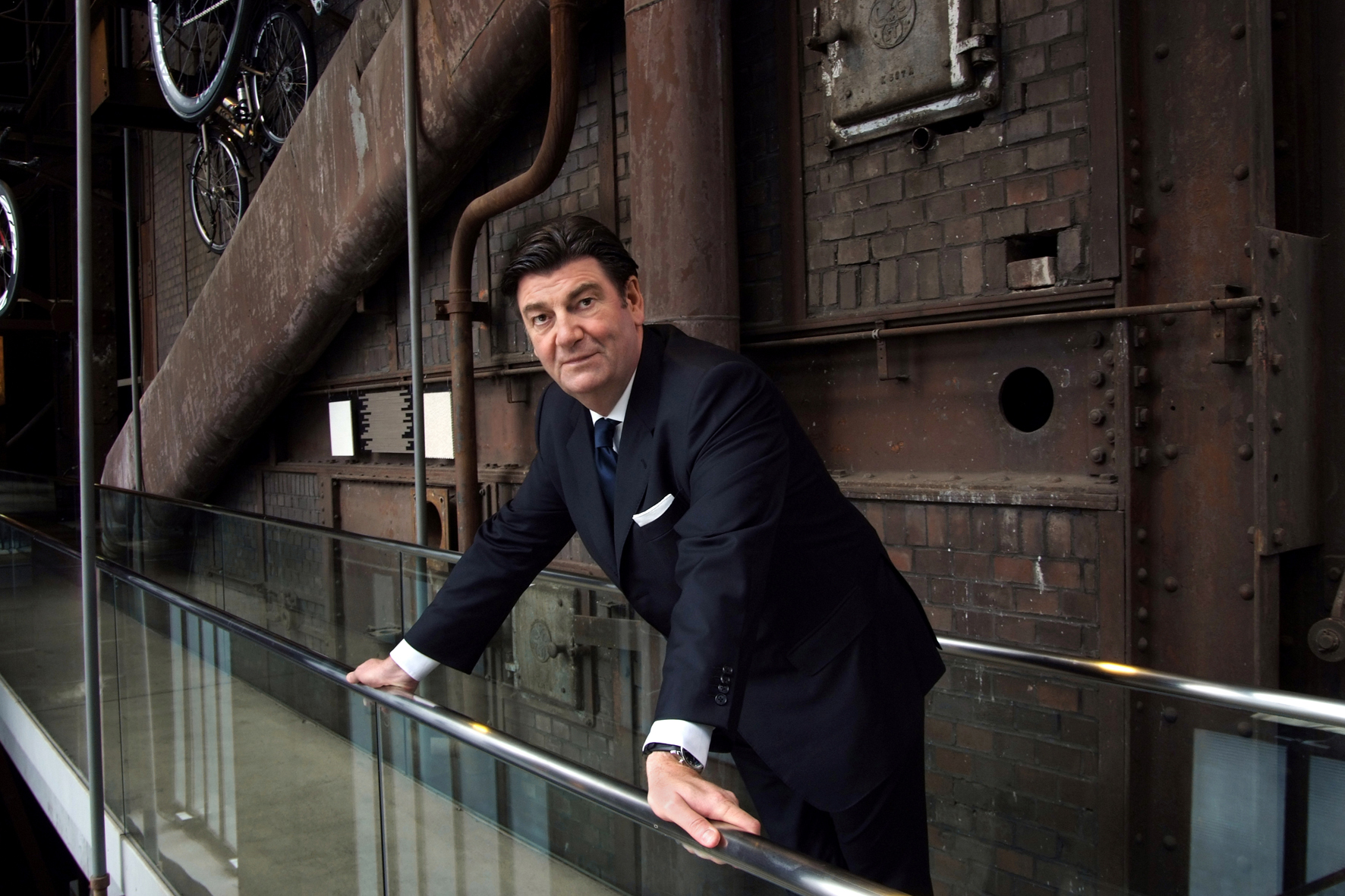
A portrait of Peter Zec

Peter Zec (born 1956) is a German design consultant as well as author and publisher. Furthermore, he is president (2005–2007) of the International Council of Societies of Industrial Design (Icsid), the global organisation that promotes better design around the world, and initiator of the Red Dot Design Award. In October 2006, the German business magazine “Wirtschaftswoche” elected him one of the “20 creative unconventional thinkers changing the appearance of their companies and creating completely new markets”.

== Life ==
Peter Zec studied Media Studies, Psychology, and Art Theory. From 1986 to 1988 he was head of the specialist field “image” and as such was highly involved in the planning of the Centre of Arts and Media Technologies (ZKM), which had been established in Karlsruhe. Peter Zec was president of the Federation of German Graphic Designers (BDG) and the Association of German Industrial Designers (VDID). Since 1991, he has been the head of the Design Zentrum Nordrhein Westfalen. During these years he has published books and compendia about the subject of design and he has accepted invitations to lecture all over the world.

From 1993 to 2010 he was a professor for economic communication at the University of Applied Science for Technology and Economics in Berlin. Since May 2001, he is managing partner of the Red Dot GmbH & Co. KG. Zec is of the opinion that design may contribute to a significant appreciation and greater success on the international market if it is included as a relevant basis into corporate strategy. After the Red Dot Design Award has established as one of the biggest design awards in the past years also in the Asian countries Zec together with Ken Koo, present manager of red dot Singapore, succeeds to call into being the Red Dot Award: Design Concept.

From September 2005 to October 2007, Zec was president of the international umbrella organisation of design ICSID (International Council of Societies of Industrial Design) and from October 2006 to October 2007 chairman of the International Design Alliance IDA, thus holding the highest official posts in the design world. As a former Icsid president, he now holds the rank of “Icsid Senator” and is consulted on all important issues concerning the association. He initiated the programme "World Design Capital".

In 2016, he was honoured as "Kopf des Jahres" (Brain of the Year) by the Marketing Club Ruhr for his services to the German region. Moreover, in the same year, he was awarded honorary citizenship of the City of Seoul because of his commitment to the South Korean capital.

== Works ==
Zec is editor of the Red Dot Design Yearbook and the International Yearbook Communication Design. He has published the following books among others:

- 1988 - Informationsdesign
- 1996 - Design goes virtual!
- 1997 - German Design Standards
- 1999 - Designing Success
- 2000 - Good Design
- 2002 - Orientierung im Raum
- 2003 - Hall of Fame. Companies Searching for Excellence in Design
- 2004 - Who’s Who in Design
- 2006 - Return on Ideas - Better by Design
- 2010 - Design Value
- 2015 - Dauernde, nicht endgültige Form
- 2015 - Every Product Tells a Story
- 2017 - Homo Ex Data: The Natural of the Artificial
- 2018 - The Form of Success: Design as a Corporate Strategy (Designing Success)
- 2019 - The Form of Simplicity: Good Design for a Better Quality of Life
