= Central Police Station, Singapore =

Demolished building in Singapore

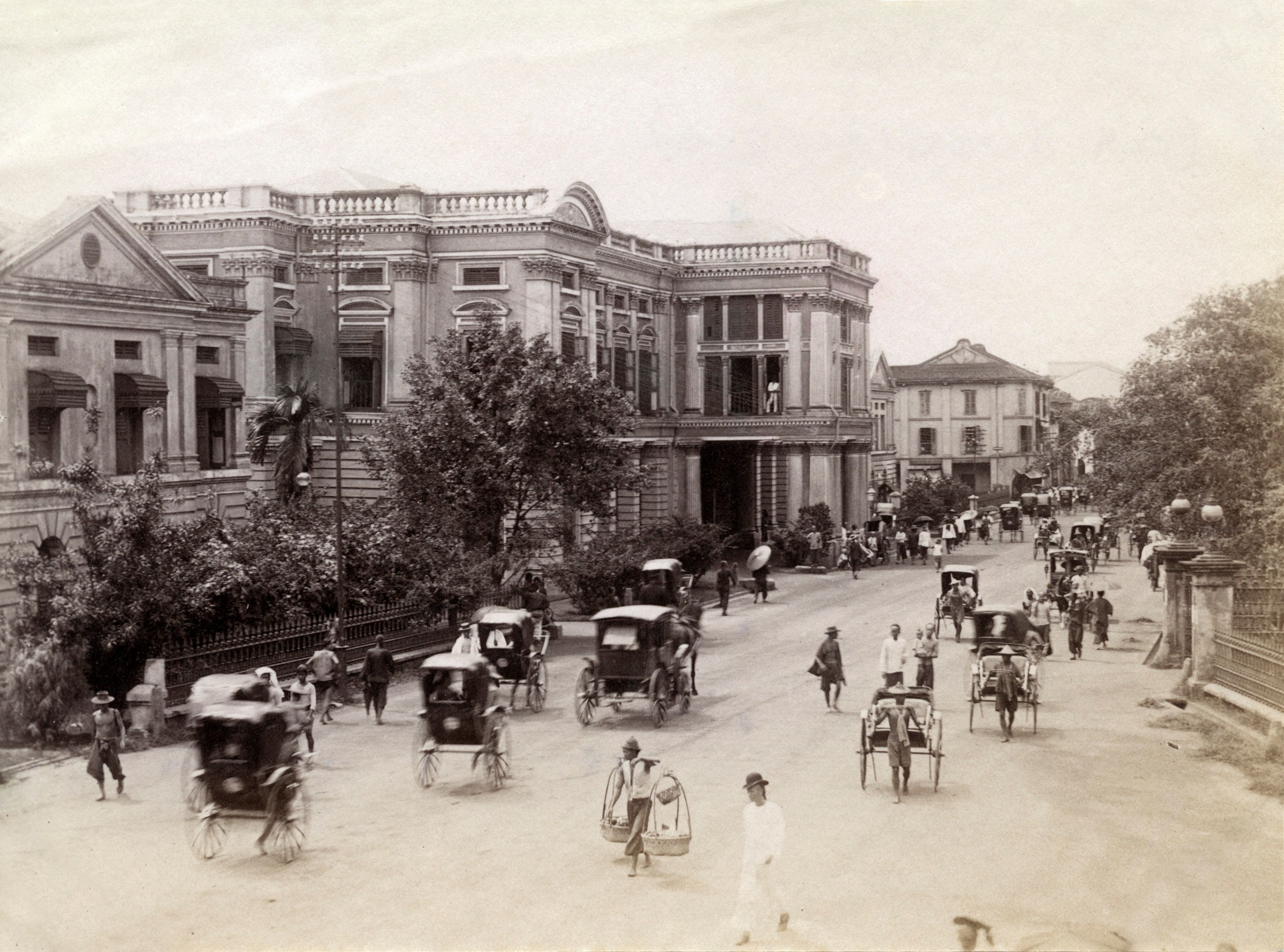
- The Central Police Station on South Bridge Road in the 1900s.
- Interactive map of the Central Police Station, Singapore area

General information
- Coordinates: 1.2858°N 103.8478°E
- Construction started: September 1884
- Opening: Early 1886
- Demolished: October 1902

The Central Police Station was a building on South Bridge Road in Singapore. Completed in 1886, it replaced an older Central Police Station and served as the headquarters of the Singapore Police Force. The building suffered from an unsteady foundation throughout its history. Despite alterations made to strengthen the structure in the 1890s, the issue persisted and the building was demolished in 1902 to make way for a smaller Central Police Station.

== Description ==
The two-storey structure was described as being "unostentatious" and of "plain and chaste design" with "just enough ornamentation" to give it a "light appearance", though this was reportedly in line with the building's "massiveness". There was a courtyard in front of the main block, intended for assemblies and drills, and it was flanked on either side by the quarters for high-ranking officers. It was centred on the same line as the newly-completed and similarly-designed Magistrates' Courts situated just across the street on Hong Lim Green.

== History ==
In the Inspector General of Police's Report for 1881, Major Samuel Dunlop, then the Inspector-General of the Straits Settlements Police Force, proclaimed that the only thing his "soul [longed] for in order to be completely satisfied" was the erection of a new Central Police Station, which he believed to be a "pressing necessity". The Straits Times opined that Dunlop had, in his "impatience to attain his own object, quietly but totally [ignored] considerations of equal, if not more public importance that bar his way". In September, it was announced that the old Central Police Station and Barracks, formerly the first civil jail on the island, and the Magistrates' Courts would be pulled down to make way for a new Central Police Station. The central station was temporarily relocated to the old Criminal Prison in the meantime. Demolition on the old station had begun the month after, though the Magistrates' Court had yet to move as their new premises were then in the process of being erected. Work on that structure was "pushed forward as rapidly as possible" such that the old courts could be pulled down.

The old Magistrates' Court was demolished in August 1884, and the project as a whole was then estimated to cost $100,000. The main block itself cost $70,000 to erect. Work on the new station had begun the month after and was "being rapidly proceeded with", though it was expected that this would "take a long time to complete." It was erected on concrete footing and timber rafts. The new building, to have an "impressive" general effect, was also to house the offices of the Inspector General and other high-ranking officers of the force. In October, the Straits Times reported that the construction of the building had deviated from the plans in that it had begun to encroach on the nearby drain erected by Henry McCallum. The building was complete by early 1886 and the offices of the Police Department officially moved in at the start of April.

In June 1892, the leadwork on the roof ridge was "considerably unsettled" by a "rather severe squall". In February 1893, the Singapore Free Press And Mercantile Advertiser reported that the building had long suffered from the "unsatisfactory nature of the ground beneath", and that in recent months the front had been "threatening to depart more and more seriously from the path of linear rectitude", with the walls being in danger of "[departing] from the perpendicular". It was then proposed that a 9ft wide verandah running the entire length of the main block be built to strengthen the structure. The pillars at the central portico were to be moved 10ft forward such that it would nearly line up with the compound wall. Two two-storey porticos were to be installed in either end of the main block. The works were to cost $8,000. These additions were completed in or about 1893, and were recorded as having cost $9,924, though the Colonial Engineer believed that the actual cost "must be greater". The exterior was whitewashed and painted over in 1898. In June, a room at the building was converted into the offices of the newly-appointed magistrate who was to assist the Commissioner of Court Requests. The Court of Requests remained there for about a year more before relocating to the Magistrates' Courts. Due to a termite infestation in the beams, some of the woodwork and plaster at the main entrance collapse in October. The wood there was then replaced by an iron girder.

In September 1900, the Legislative Council of the Straits Settlements voted to install sinking piles below the main block's foundations for $700 in order to "ascertain the carrying power" of the ground below. By then, the Municipal Engineer and Colonial Engineer had already assessed that the structure was not unstable. The motion was proposed by the acting Colonial Secretary Charles Walter Sneyd-Kynnersley, who argued that this was to "defray the expense of certain expreiments to be carried out" to determine the stability of the structure such that further alterations could be made to the structure if necessary. Legislative Councillor John Burkinshaw criticised the motion, believing it to be a "preceding step to a very large expenditure" and opining that the government "generally seemed to act in making very large expenditures solely and entirely on the recommendations of their officers." The offices of the Commissioner of the Court of Requests moved into the ground floor of the building in January 1902. The building had been demolished by October to make way for a new Central Police Station and the foundations for the new building were to be laid by the end of the year.
