= Millenia Singapore =

Development in Singapore

Coordinates: 1°17′39.10″N 103°51′31.23″E

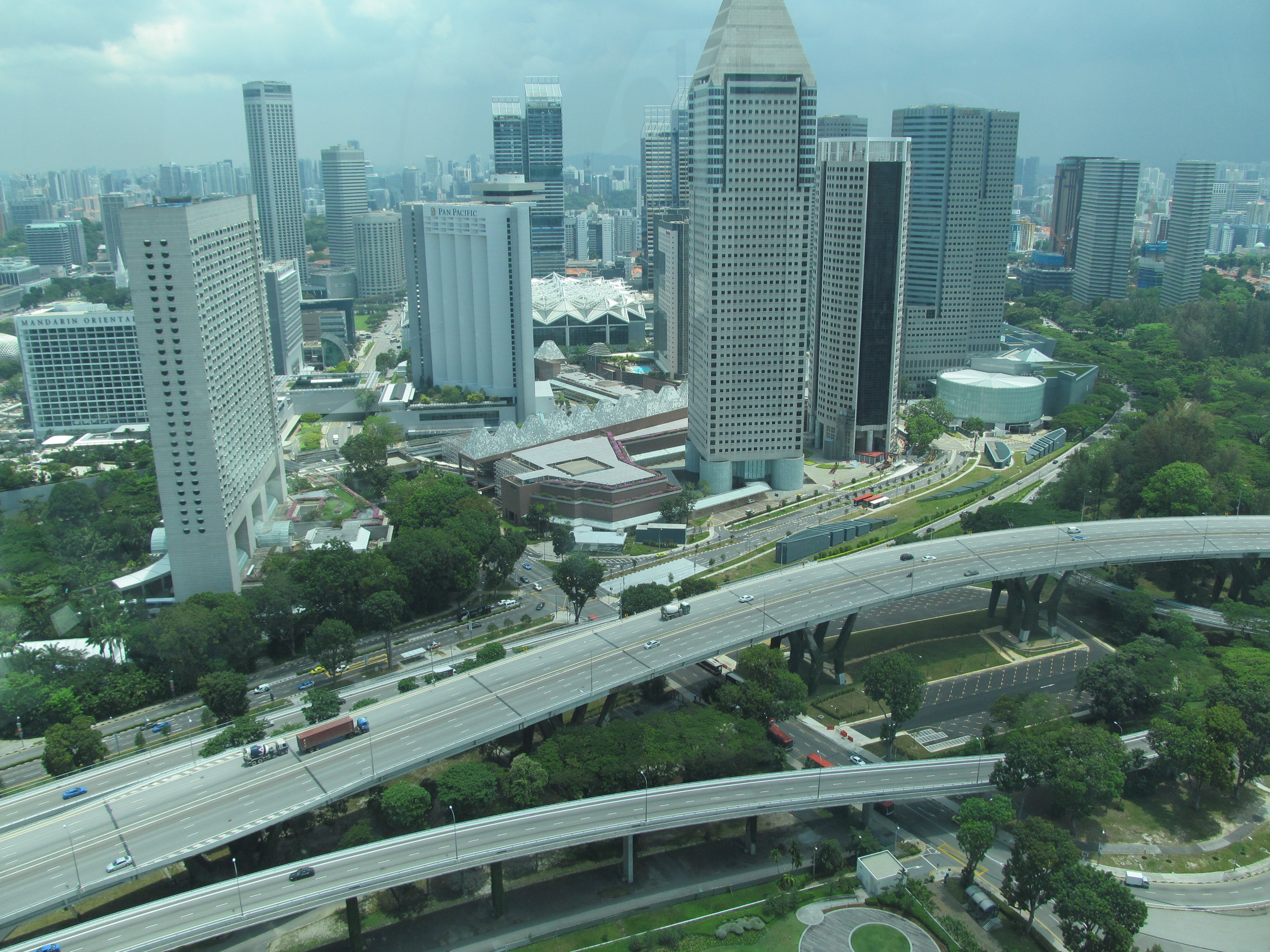
A view of Millenia Singapore from the Singapore Flyer in April 2015

Millenia Singapore is an integrated landmark development of Pontiac Land Group, nested in the Downtown Core of Singapore. It sits on land reclaimed in the 1970s from Marina Bay with five buildings designed by award-winning architects Kevin Roche, Thom Mayne, Philip Johnson and John Burgee.

Before the 1970s, the area was open water used by sea vessels for anchorage with the Queen Elizabeth Walk along what is now the western end of this area. Part of the Singapore Grand Prix runs through the entire part of Millenia Singapore.

== Buildings ==
- Millenia Tower: 41-storey Grade A office tower with a total gross floor area of 835,000 sq ft. It is designed by Pritzker Prize laureate Kevin Roche.
- Centennial Tower: 34-storey Grade A office tower in the central business district of Singapore, with a total gross floor area of 710,000 sq ft. Its anchor tenant is Sumitomo Mitsui Banking Corporation.
- Conrad Centennial Singapore: 31-storey, 525 room deluxe hotel managed by Conrad International Hotels. It was voted 'Singapore's Leading Business Hotel' at the 16th World Travel Awards.
- The Ritz-Carlton Millenia Singapore: 32-storey, 610 room super-deluxe hotel managed by The Ritz Carlton Hotel Company. The five-stars hotel is Rank #2 in TripAdvisor Travellers’ Choice Awards for Top 10 Luxury Hotels in Singapore.

=== Millenia Walk ===
Millenia Walk (Chinese: 美年径) is a shopping centre in Marina Centre of the Downtown Core, Singapore. It is a 2-storey retail mall, with a total gross area of 415,000 sq ft.

== Transportation ==
Transport is well connected by Promenade MRT station, together with the access to East Coast Parkway, Nicoll Highway, Raffles Avenue, Raffles Boulevard, Raffles Link, Rochor Road, Temasek Boulevard and Temasek Avenue.
