= Centennial Tower (Singapore) =

Office skyscraper in Singapore

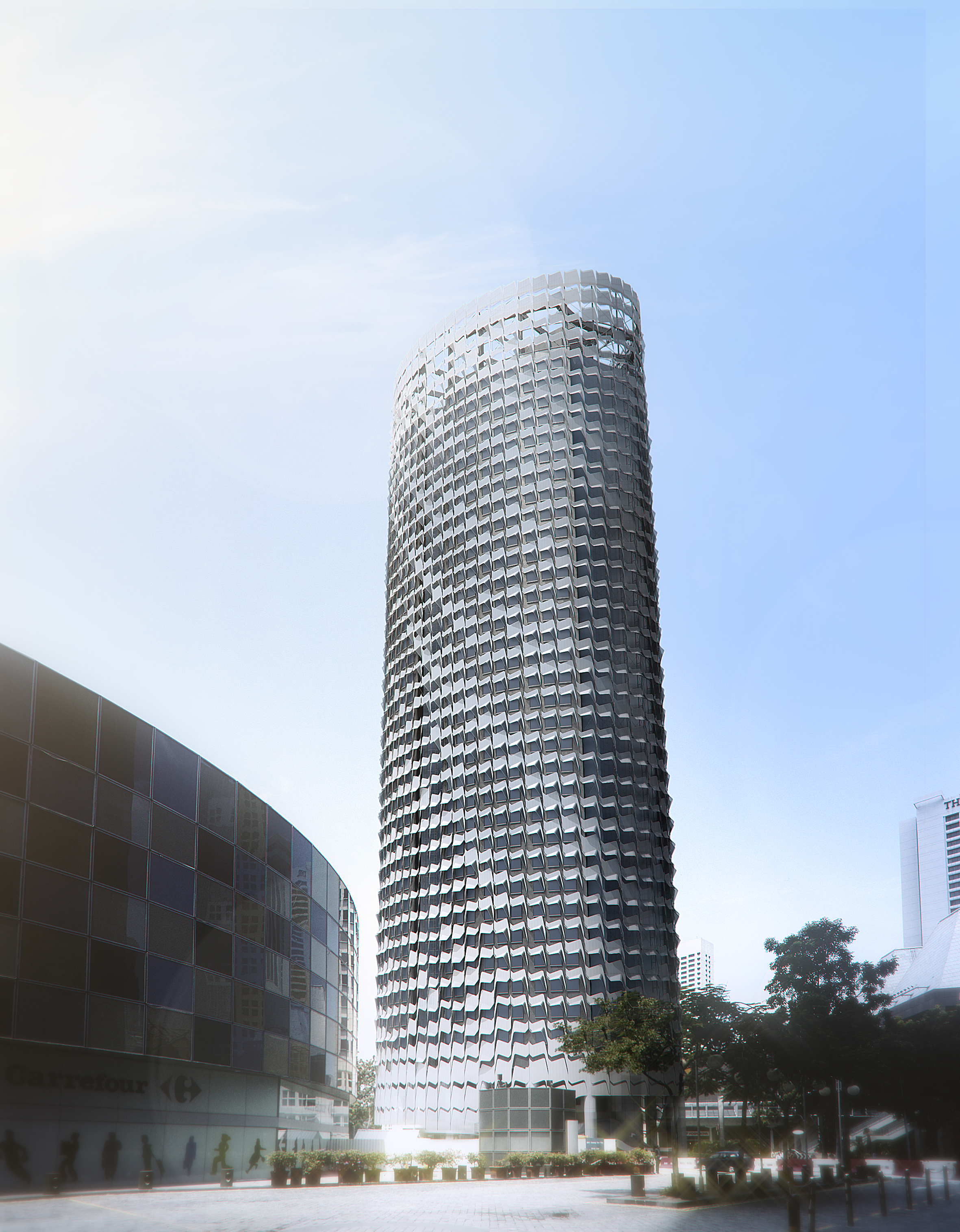
- The Centennial Tower
- Interactive map of the Centennial Tower area

General information
- Type: Commercial offices
- Location: 3 Temasek Avenue; Singapore 039190
- Coordinates: 1.293265°N 103.860142°E
- Construction started: 1995; 31 years ago
- Completed: 1997; 29 years ago
- Cost: USD149 Million
- Owner: Kwee brothers' Pontiac Land

Height
- Roof: 158 m (518 ft)

Technical details
- Floor count: 37; 2 below ground
- Floor area: 66.270 m^{2} (713.32 sq ft)

Design and construction
- Architects: Kevin Roche and Thom Mayne
- Main contractor: Dragages Singapore Pte Ltd

Centennial Tower is a 158-metre (518 ft), 37-storey high-rise office skyscraper in the central business district of Singapore. It is located on 3 Temasek Avenue, in the zone of Marina Centre. The building is nearby other skyscrapers such as Millenia Tower, and Suntec City.

The building won the Building and Construction Authority's Best Buildable Design Award in the Commercial & Office Buildings category in 1999.

The tower was built at a total cost of USD149 Million. It has a gross floor area of 66,270 square metres.

Centennial Tower's anchor tenant is LGT Group.

== History ==
Centennial Tower was initially designed by Pritzker Architecture Prize Laureate Kevin Roche. In 2015, the building underwent a recladding exercise, unveiling a newly designed facade by yet another Pritzker Architecture Prize Laureate, Thom Mayne.

Although completed in 1997, it was structurally designed and built to allow for future upward expansion by as much as 15 additional stories to reach 52 stories. During the construction of the building, the use of innovative and newer construction techniques allowed it to rise 20 stories in just 3 months, one of the fastest rates of construction then seen in Singapore. This enabled the contractor to save 5 months of construction, as compared to using the conventional method. Precast staircases, prefabricated reinforcement for the core walls, beams and columns were also used to enhance the productivity on site.

== Art ==
A 6m by 15m mural entitled “Persistence of Electrical Nymphs in Space” by James Rosenquist sits in the Centennial Tower lobby. Rosenquist painted the mural in 1985, at a time when he was contemplating issues of life. Two smaller murals measuring 6m by 6m complement the painting; entitled “Singapore” and “Bali”, these 2 murals were specially commissioned to capture the mystique of lush tropical havens.

== Architecture ==
The tower was first designed by Pritzker Prize laureate Kevin Roche in 1997. In 2017, the tower was re-envisioned by Pritzker Prize laureate Thom Mayne, who designed a metal coat of interlinking window modules to clad the tower.

The tower has an elliptical structure, which reflected the curvilinear frontage of Temasek Avenue. Similar to its neighbour Millenia Tower, the 360 degree windows and large floor plates provide better space efficiency. Most of the offices have good views of the city area of Singapore.

The contractor designed special formwork system, to suit the curved profile of the facade. The column, wall and facade were all constructed in the same operation by using the specially designed formwork. Telescopic table formwork system was used for the construction of the beams and floor slabs. The use of system formwork produced a high quality finish, which eliminated plastering. In fact, all the components were skim-coated.

To clad up the building, granite cladding and a curtain wall were used. The curtain wall, which has a total area of 7,773 m^{2} (83,670 sq ft), was standardised to six different panel sizes. Off-site fabrication of these wall system made installation faster. This reduced the number of site labour.

The tower is crowned by a twelve metre high ornamental trellis. This complements the adjacent pyramid atop Millenia Tower.

== Amenities ==
The service desk at Centennial Tower is helmed by the Millenia Concierge.

Centennial Tower is built on a two-storey basement carpark, which links to the other developments within Millenia Singapore, namely Millenia Walk, Millenia Tower, The Ritz-Carlton, Millenia Singapore and Conrad Centennial Singapore.

== Locality ==
Centennial Tower is adjacent to Millenia Tower and less than 100 metres away from Promenade MRT station, with access to both the Circle and Downtown line.

== See also ==
- List of tallest buildings in Singapore
- Marina Centre
- Millenia Tower
