= The Ritz-Carlton Millenia Singapore =

The Ritz-Carlton, Millenia Singapore
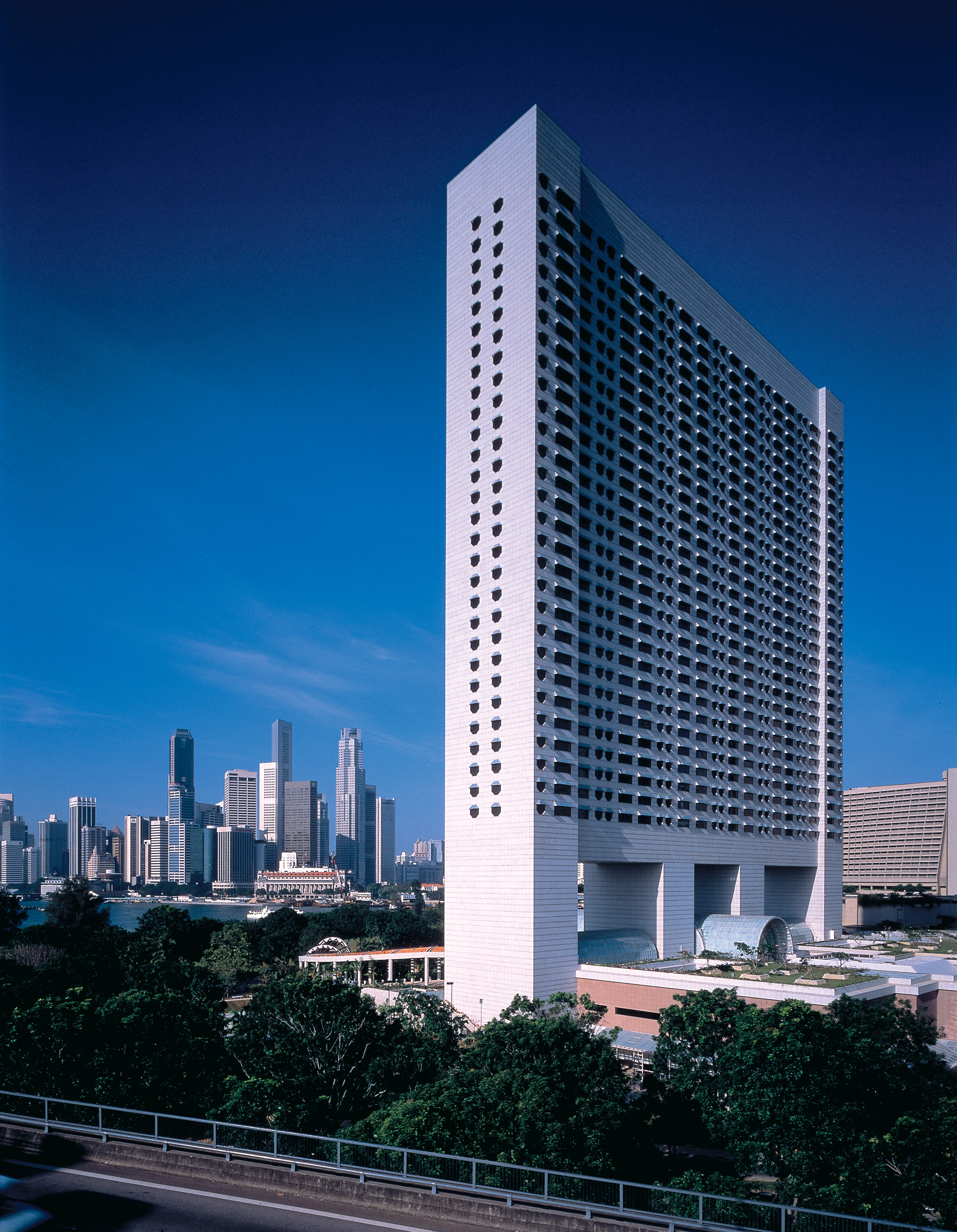
- Photographed in May 2005

- Location within Singapore

General information
- Status: Occupied
- Type: Hotel
- Architectural style: High-rise
- Location: Raffles Avenue, Marina Centre, Downtown Core, Singapore
- Coordinates: 1°17′26.5″N 103°51′35.2″E
- Construction started: 1990
- Completed: 1996
- Opening: 1996
- Owner: Kwee brothers' Pontiac Land
- Operator: Ritz-Carlton

Technical details
- Floor count: 32 and 2 basements

Design and construction
- Architects: Kevin Roche John Dinkeloo and Associates with DP Architects Pte Ltd; Interior_designers: HBA/Hirsch Bedner Associates
- Developer: Pontiac Land

Website
- http://www.ritzcarlton.com/singapore

The Ritz-Carlton, Millenia Singapore is a 32 floor luxury hotel located at Millenia Singapore, Marina Centre, Singapore. The hotel is run by The Ritz-Carlton group of hotels, and it has won several awards. The hotel was opened in 1996, developed and owned by the Kwee brothers' company Pontiac Land.

== Notable guests ==
Taylor Swift stayed at the hotel in February 2011 whilst in Singapore promoting her Speak Now World Tour. Lady Gaga was originally staying at the Mandarin Oriental, Singapore whilst promoting her Born This Way Ball tour in May 2012; however, when the New Paper published that she was staying there, many fans were gathering outside the hotel, provoking her to move to The Ritz-Carlton, Millenia Singapore, which is next door. The SMTown artists stayed for their sixth leg for SMTown Live World Tour III in 2012. Yoshiki, drummer of the Japanese metal band X Japan stayed at the hotel in January 2015. Famous YouTuber couples Nick and Carrie stayed in the hotel for their first ever fan meet in Singapore in July 2024.

== Facilities ==
The Ritz-Carlton, Millenia Singapore was designed by the architect Kevin Roche, who won the Pritzker Prize, with DP Architects. The hotel has a 4,200 piece modern contemporary art collection which includes works by Frank Stella, Andy Warhol and Dale Chihuly. The interior design was done by Hirsch Bedner Associates.

The hotel has 608 guest rooms and suites, and a Club Lounge located at the top floor.

Summer Pavilion, one of the hotel's restaurant, earned its first Michelin Star in the inaugural Michelin Guide Singapore 2016. Colony is the hotel's all-day dining restaurant, featuring Singapore's heritage cuisines with seven different conservatory kitchens helmed by 'live' culinary showmanship. Conference facilities include the 1,090-square metre Grand Ballroom, the Chihuly Room, the Garden Pavilion, and 8 additional meeting and function rooms.

In December 2016, The Ritz-Carlton Spa, Singapore opened in partnership with La Mer, making it the first luxury hotel to partner with La Mer in Asia Pacific. The hotel also features an outdoor swimming pool, 24-hour fitness center and tropical-themed garden.

In May 2017, the hotel unveiled a new overwater pool platform that allows for a versatile outdoor venue, making it the first luxury hotel in Singapore to offer the flexibility of holding events over water through partially, or completely covering the pool.

== Events ==
The 117th IOC Session, the New York delegation team stayed at the hotel. A number of products were launched at the hotel such as the new Mercedes-Benz S-Class. The hotel is designated as an IOC Hotel during the 2010 Summer Youth Olympics in Singapore and has successfully hosted the event, one of the highlights would be the 1st Summer Youth Olympic Games Opening Gala Dinner by the IOC President. The 14th edition of Pradhana Vizha also held here on 31 July 2014.

== Bibliography ==
- Aun Koh, Susan Leong (2006), Singapore chic, Archipelago Press, ISBN 981-4155-74-8
