= Conrad Singapore Marina Bay =

Hotel in Marina Centre, Singapore

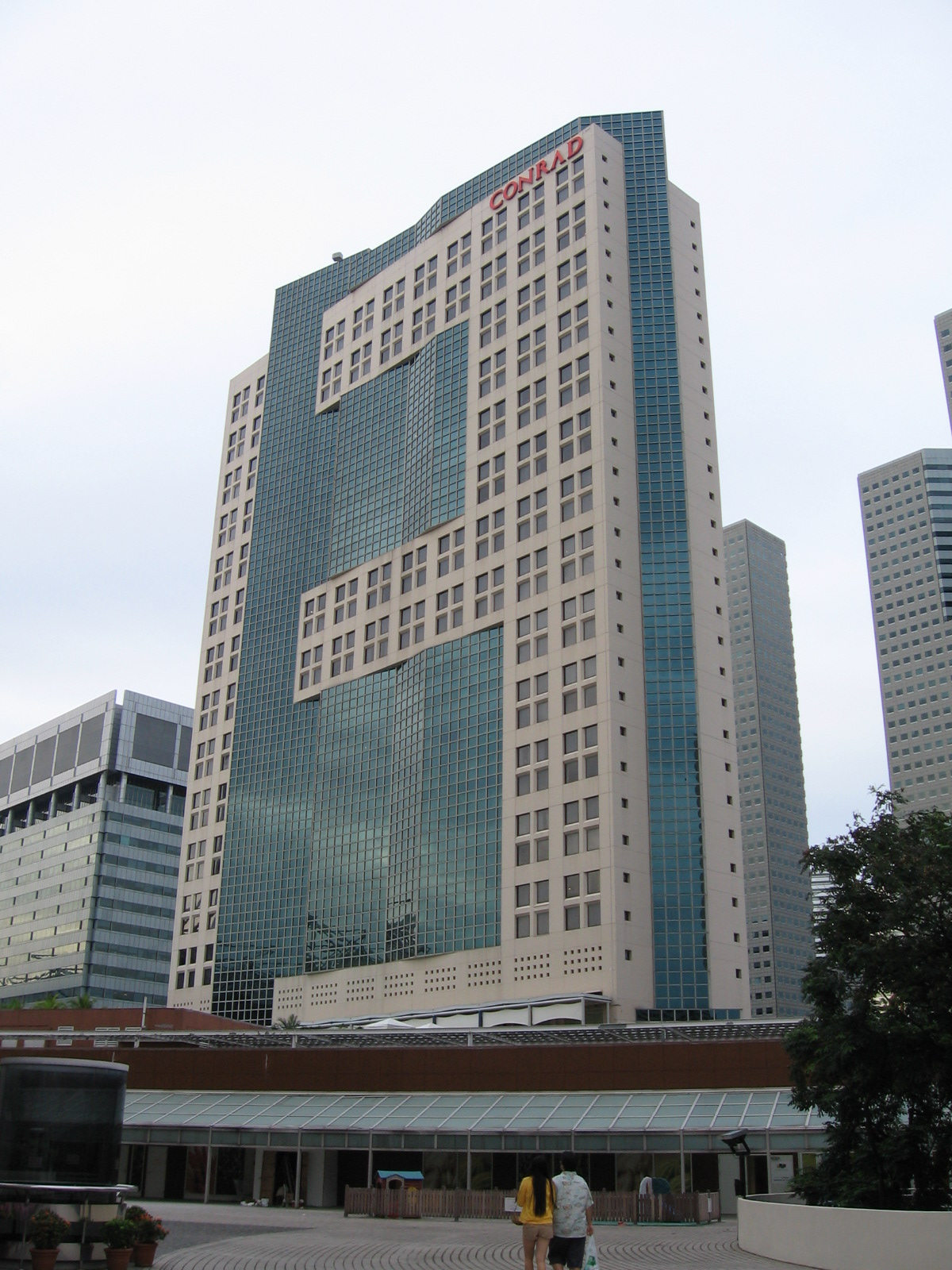

- Location within Singapore

General information
- Location: 2 Temasek Boulevard, Singapore 038982
- Coordinates: 1°17′37″N 103°51′31″E
- Owner: Kwee brothers' Pontiac Land
- Management: Conrad Hotels

Technical details
- Floor count: 31

Other information
- Number of rooms: 512
- Number of suites: 25

Website
- http://www.conradsingaporemarinabay.com

Conrad Singapore Marina Bay (Chinese: 新加坡滨海湾康莱德酒店) is a luxury hotel located in the Downtown Core (near Millenia Tower), Marina Centre, Singapore. Formerly known as Conrad Centennial Singapore, the hotel was renamed on 15 April 2025, to emphasise its close ties to the Marina Bay district.

The hotel comprises 512 guest rooms, including 25 suites, spread across 31 floors. Designed by Johnson Burgee Architects, it was completed in 1996. The property is owned by Pontiac Land (owned by the Kwee brothers).

Conrad Singapore Marina Bay has over 3,400 pieces of Asian contemporary art displayed throughout the hotel. Amenities include a 20-metre (66 ft) outdoor lap pool, a fitness center, a spa, and multiple dining venues such as Golden Peony, Oscar’s, and the Lobby Lounge.

== Rooms ==
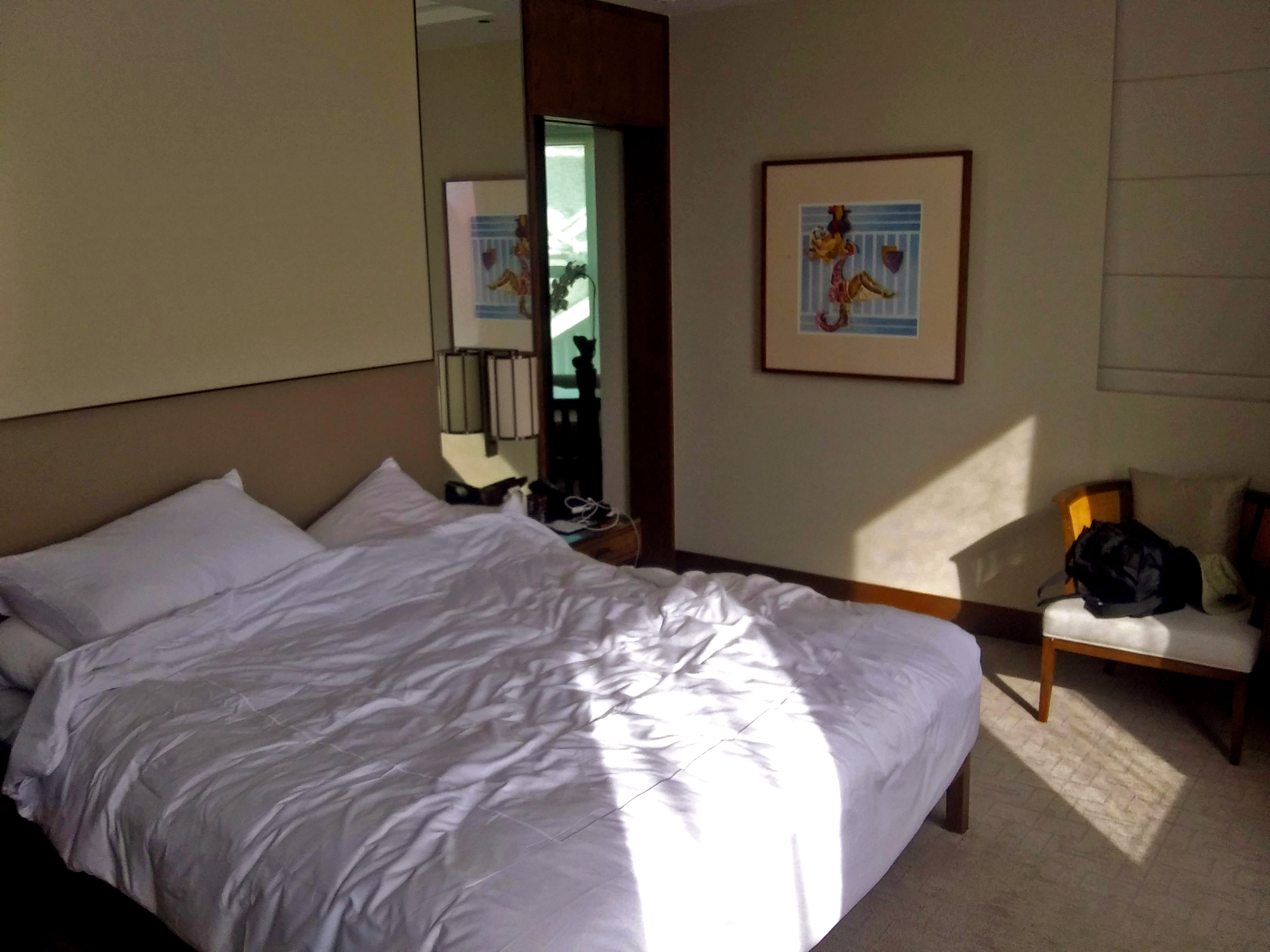
A typical room

The property offers 512 guest rooms, including 25 suites, across 31 floors. It features 96 sets of connecting rooms.
