= Six Brushstrokes =

Art installation in Singapore

Six Brushstrokes is an art installation by Roy Lichtenstein in Singapore's Millenia Walk. It includes six aluminium sculptures commissioned for the space.
