= CE1 =

CE1 may refer to:

- CE1, a level of Education in France
- 0s, the year which can also be described as 1 CE and might be incorrectly described as CE1
- Bayfront MRT station, Singapore
