= Bayfront MRT station =

Mass Rapid Transit station in Singapore

Bayfront CC34 DT16 海湾舫 பேஃபிரண்ட்
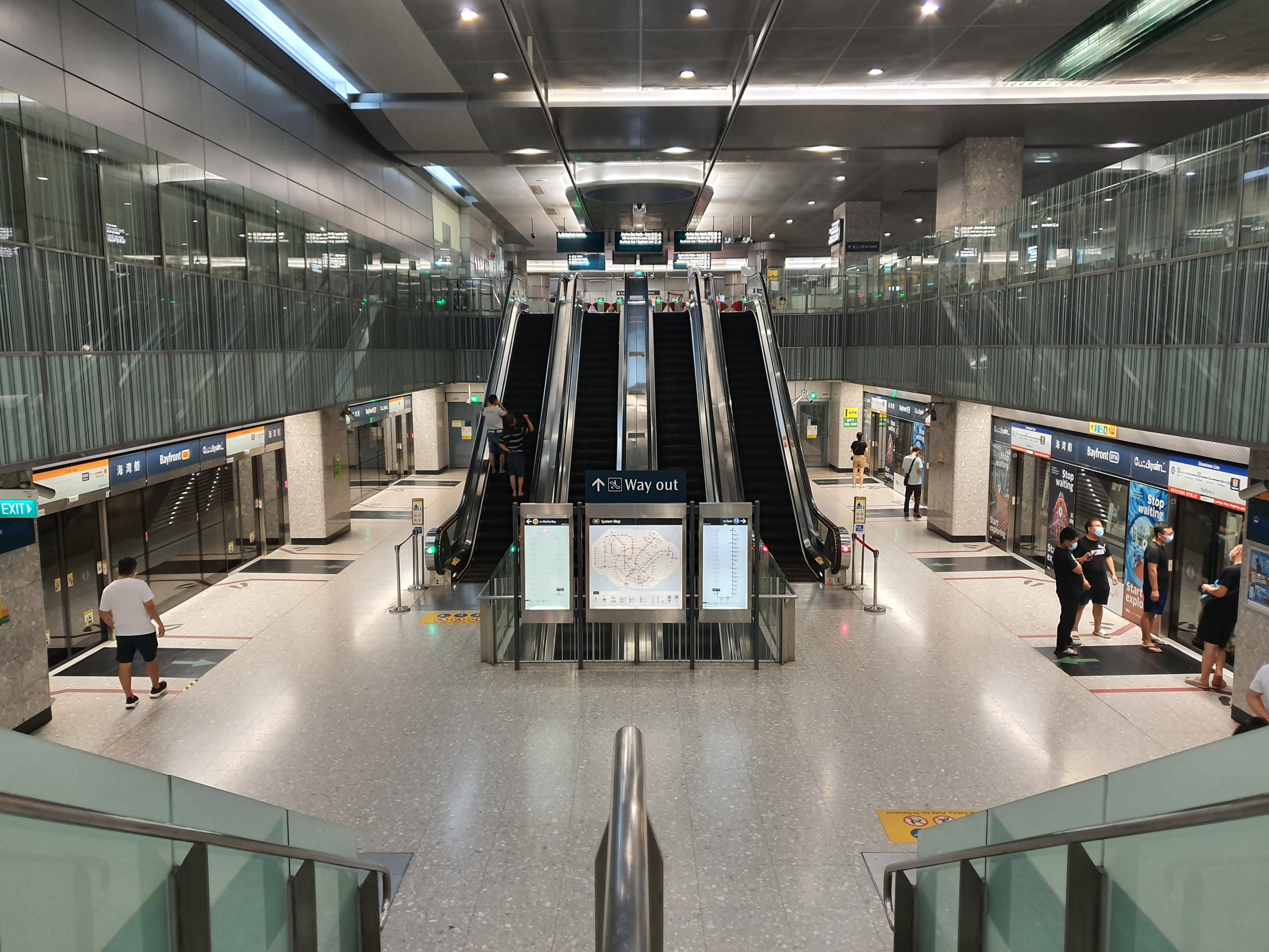
- Upper platform level (Platforms A and B) of Bayfront station

General information
- Location: 11 Bayfront Avenue, Singapore 018957
- Coordinates: 01°16′57″N 103°51′34″E
- System: Mass Rapid Transit (MRT) interchange
- Owner: Land Transport Authority
- Operator: SMRT Trains (Circle Line); SBS Transit (Downtown Line)
- Line: Circle Line Downtown Line
- Platforms: 4 (2 island platforms)
- Tracks: 4
- Connections: Bus, Taxi

Construction
- Structure type: Underground
- Platform levels: 2
- Parking: Yes (Marina Bay Sands)
- Cycle facilities: Yes
- Accessible: Yes

Other information
- Station code: BFT

History
- Opened: 14 January 2012; 14 years ago (Circle Line); 22 December 2013; 12 years ago (Downtown Line)

Passengers
- June 2024: 38,076 per day

Services
Preceding station	Mass Rapid Transit	Following station
Marina Bay Clockwise	Circle Line	Promenade Anticlockwise
Promenade towards Bukit Panjang	Downtown Line	Downtown towards Expo
Track layout
Location
- Location within Singapore Rail central area

Bayfront MRT station is an underground Mass Rapid Transit (MRT) interchange station on the Downtown Line (DTL) and Circle Line (CCL). Located in the Downtown Core of Singapore, the station is underneath Bayfront Avenue and serves the main tourist attractions of Marina Bay Sands and Gardens by the Bay.

The station was first announced in 2005 as part of the Downtown Extension of the CCL, which was later revised to be the first stage of the DTL. In 2007, it was also announced that the station would interchange with the CCL branch to Marina Bay station. CCL services to the station first commenced in January 2012, while DTL services began in December 2013. The station features an Art-in-Transit artwork When the Ships Comes In by Lee Wen.

== History ==
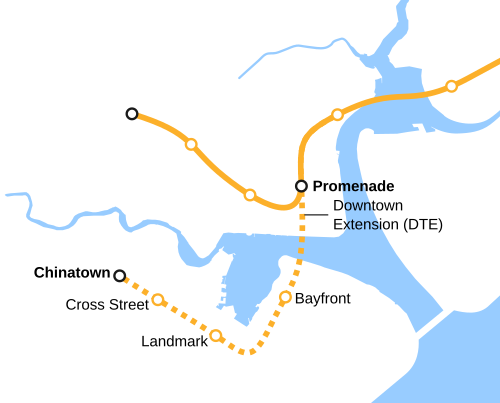
The original Downtown Extension (DTE) from Promenade to Chinatown

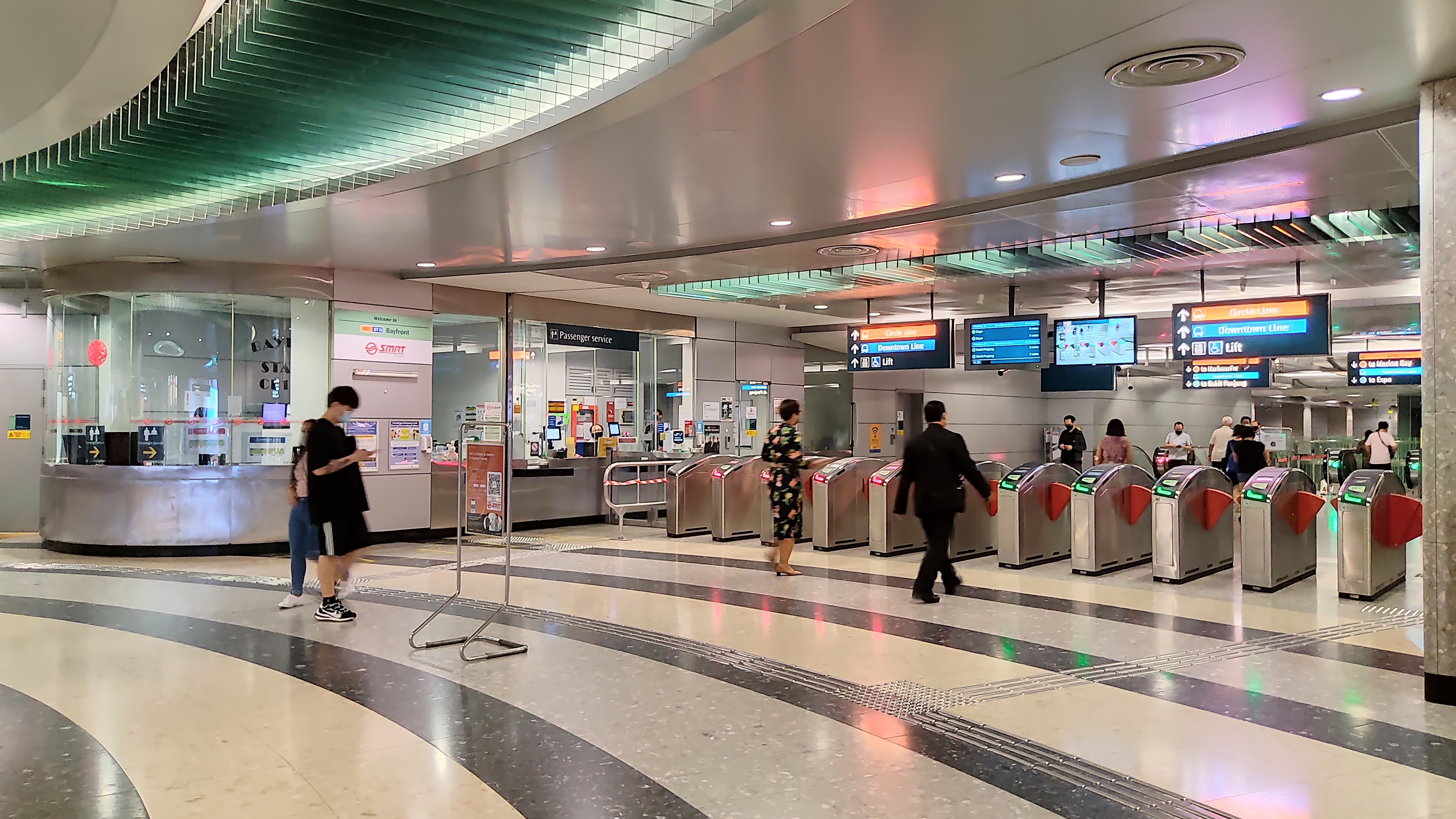
Faregates at the concourse level

On 14 June 2005, the Land Transport Authority (LTA) announced that Bayfront station would be part of the Downtown Extension (DTE) from Milennia station (now Promenade) to Chinatown. The station would serve the upcoming integrated resort, now known as Marina Bay Sands. Initially planned to be a branch of the Circle Line (CCL), the DTE was revised to be the first stage of the Downtown Line (DTL) in 2007. The station would also be an interchange station with the 2.4 km (1.5-mile) CCL branch to Marina Bay station.

The initial Chinese name for Bayfront station (贝弗兰) generated some controversy. Deputy local news editor of the Chinese-speaking newspaper Lianhe Zaobao Chua Chim Kang criticised the translation, calling it "meaningless" and an "erosion" of the Chinese language. LTA subsequently changed the provisional Chinese name for the station to its existing translation that reflected the "maritime flavour" of the area served by the station, with "海湾" meaning "bay" and "舫" meaning "small boats".

The contract for the station's construction and associated tunnels was awarded to Sembawang Engineers & Constructors for S$463 million (US$345.5 million) in November 2007. The northern end of the station was designed by the developer of the Marina Bay Sands Integrated Resort. The station construction required coordination with Marina Bay Sands to integrate the station design with the resort. As announced on 28 November 2011, the station opened on 14 January 2012, with an official opening ceremony the day before. The DTL platforms commenced operations on 22 December 2013.

== Station details ==
Bayfront station is a cross-platform interchange between the CCL and DTL with two island platforms. From the north, the CCL and DTL go towards Promenade MRT station. To the south, the DTL goes towards Downtown station while the CCL goes towards Marina Bay station. The official station code is CC34/DT16.

Located under Bayfront Avenue close to Marina Bay, Bayfront station serves Marina Bay Sands and Gardens by the Bay. The station has five entrances. Other landmarks surrounding the station include Helix Bridge, Art Science Museum, Merlion Park, Red Dot Design Museum, and The Fullerton Hotel.

The linkway connecting Bayfront station to attractions such as Gardens by the Bay was a popular practice space for local dancers because of its full-length mirrors. However, following public complaints that dancers were obstructing heavy pedestrian traffic, the management of Marina Bay Sands had the mirrors frosted on 1 January 2026. The move had been criticised online as "overly harsh", with one commenting the place was an opportunity to "experience cultural identity". Some defended the move as the dancers were obstructing the space. A new dance space was established by SMRT Corporation at Marina South Pier station on 15 January.

=== Public art ===
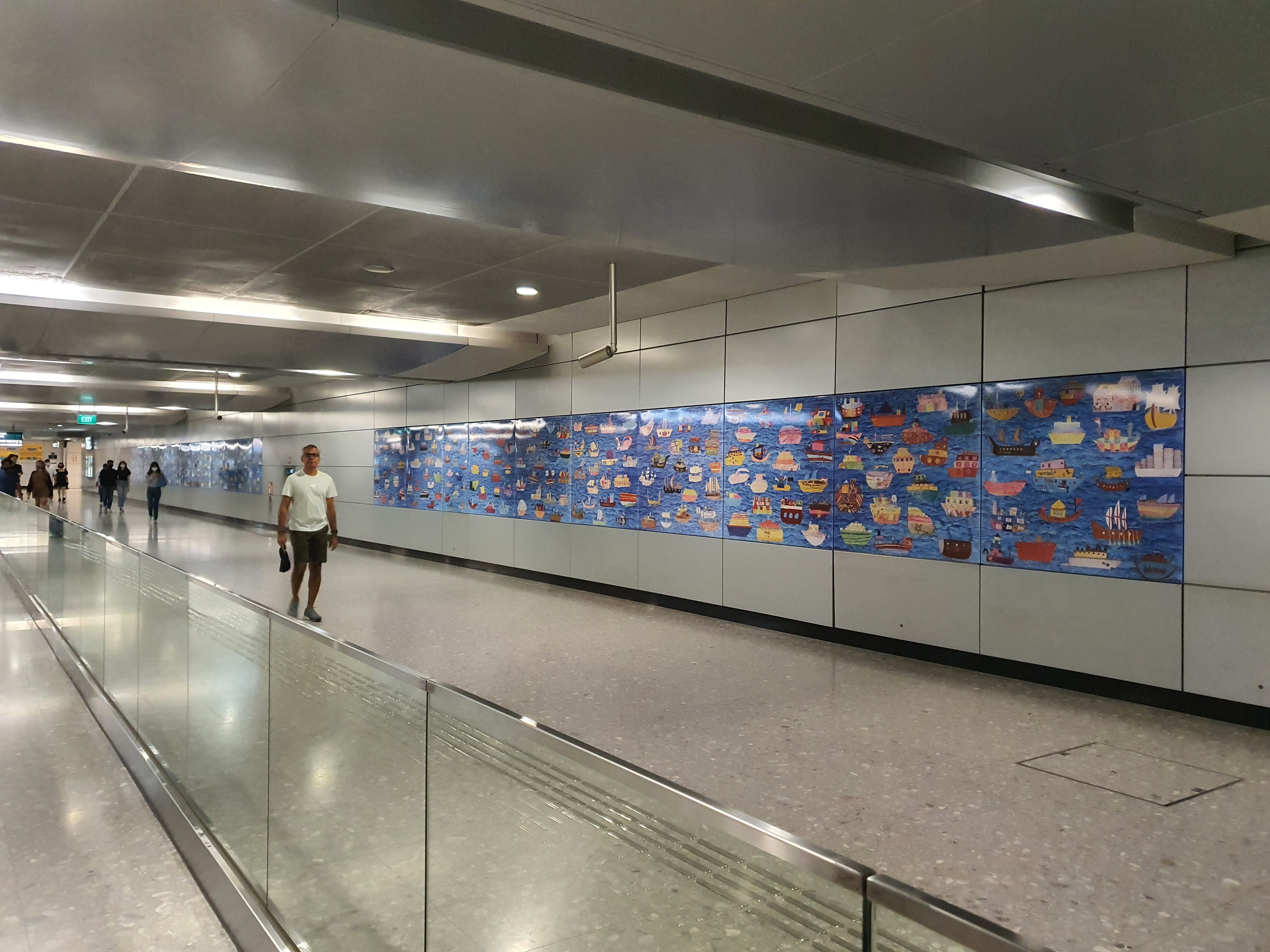
Artwork at the concourse level

When the Ship Comes In by Lee Wen is displayed along the station concourse as part of the Art-in-Transit programme, a showcase of public artworks on the MRT network. The work depicts a series of ships hand-drawn by Singaporean children aged 7 to 12. Based on fantasy or other existing ships, the designs included boats powered by whales and dragons, or those made of food and recycled bottles.

The display pays tribute to the importance of Singapore as a port of call. The children's artwork is intended to recall the history and project the children's hope for the future. The artwork title is inspired by a Bob Dylan song of the same name, and the artist hoped to reflect the song's message of the value of life.

Over one thousand ship designs were created through workshops held in various primary schools and coordinated by the artist and his friends, including Chye Teck and Chun Kaiqun. Due to the limited space of the canvas, only some were selected based on the creativity of the design rather than how well-drawn the ships were. These were scanned into digital images, before the work was silkscreened on vitreous enamel panels.
