= Camden Medical Centre =

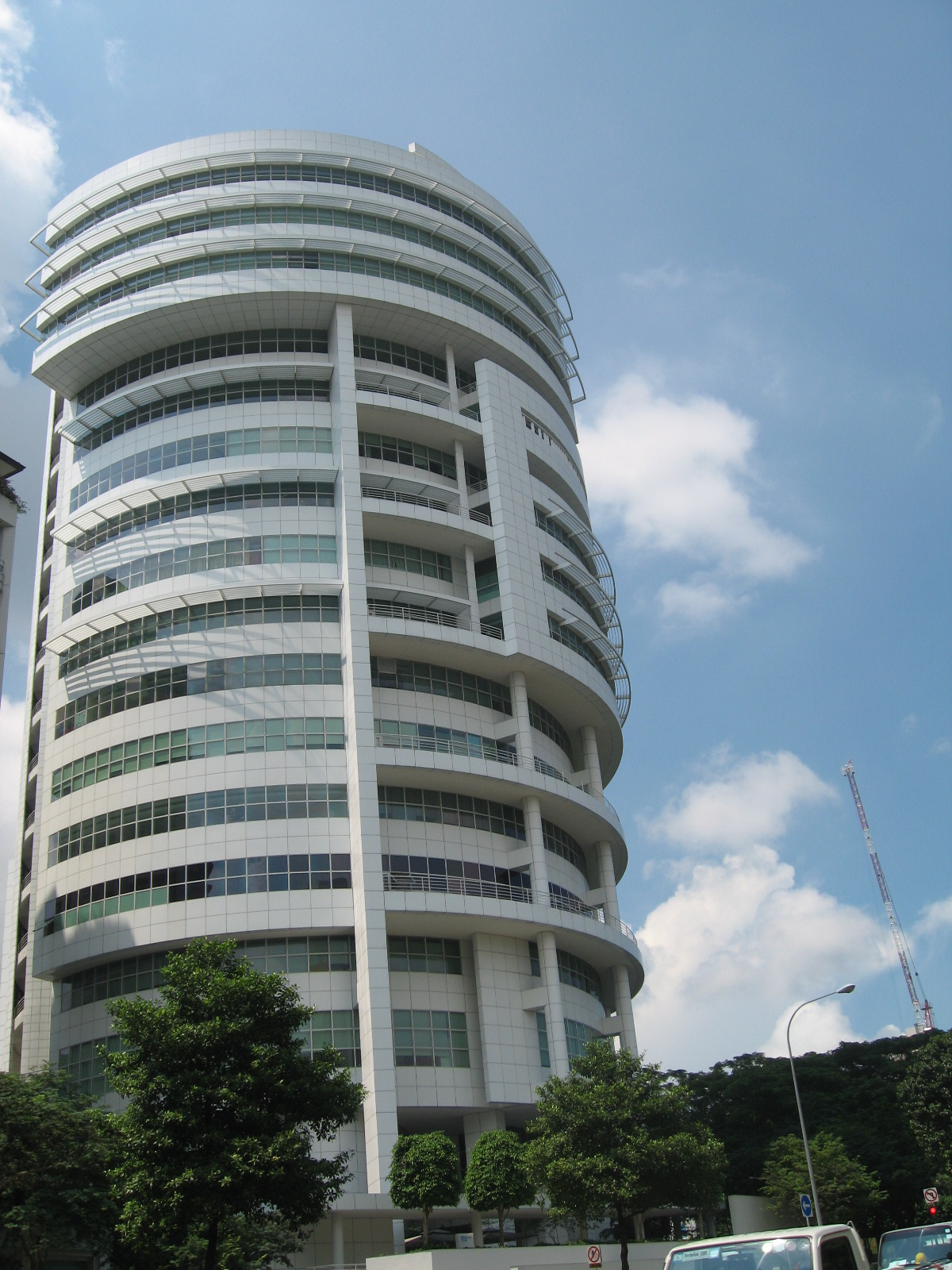

Geography
- Location: Singapore
- Coordinates: 1.3030989°N 103.8239723°E

History
- Opened: 1999

Links
- Website: www.camden.com.sg
- Lists: Hospitals in Singapore

Camden Medical is a private medical centre in Singapore. It was established in 1999 and is located at One Orchard Boulevard near the Tanglin and Orchard Road area next to Orchard Boulevard MRT station. Developed by the Kwee brothers, the 17-storey cylindrical building was designed by Pritzker Prize laureate Richard Meier.

== Services ==
The centre includes more than 200 medical and healthcare specialists and takes a holistic approach to healthcare and wellness, including prevention, diagnosis, treatment and rehabilitation.

Available medical specialties include: aesthetics; plastic surgery; cleft craniofacial; physiotherapy; endocrinology; general practice; health screening; dialysis; laboratory services; nutrition and dietetics; obstetrics and gynaecology; orthopaedics; paediatrics; optometry and ophthalmology; podiatry; sports medicine; and traditional Chinese medicine.

Camden Medical offers holistic and integrated care to patients and visitors through their multidisciplinary clinics across 21 different specialities and state of the art supporting medical facilities such as a day surgery and other diagnostic centres.

Centrally-located and within minutes walk from the Orchard Road shopping belt, Camden Medical is easily accessible via the Orchard Boulevard MRT station and public bus.

Additionally, the centre also has an in-house concierge service to assist with arrangements such as wheelchair accommodation, cabs and booking meeting rooms.

In 2019, HC Surgical and Medistar provided a subsidiary for a new endoscopy centre within the Camden Medical Centre. The new centre was set up to house over 150 new doctors.

In 2020, Novena Lifecare bought 55% of stakes in the Aptus Surgery Centre at Paragon Medical Centre and Novaptus Surgery Centre located at Camden Medical Centre in a deal worth S$20 million.
