= Promenade MRT station =

Mass Rapid Transit station in Singapore

Promenade CC4 DT15 宝门廊 புரொமனாட்
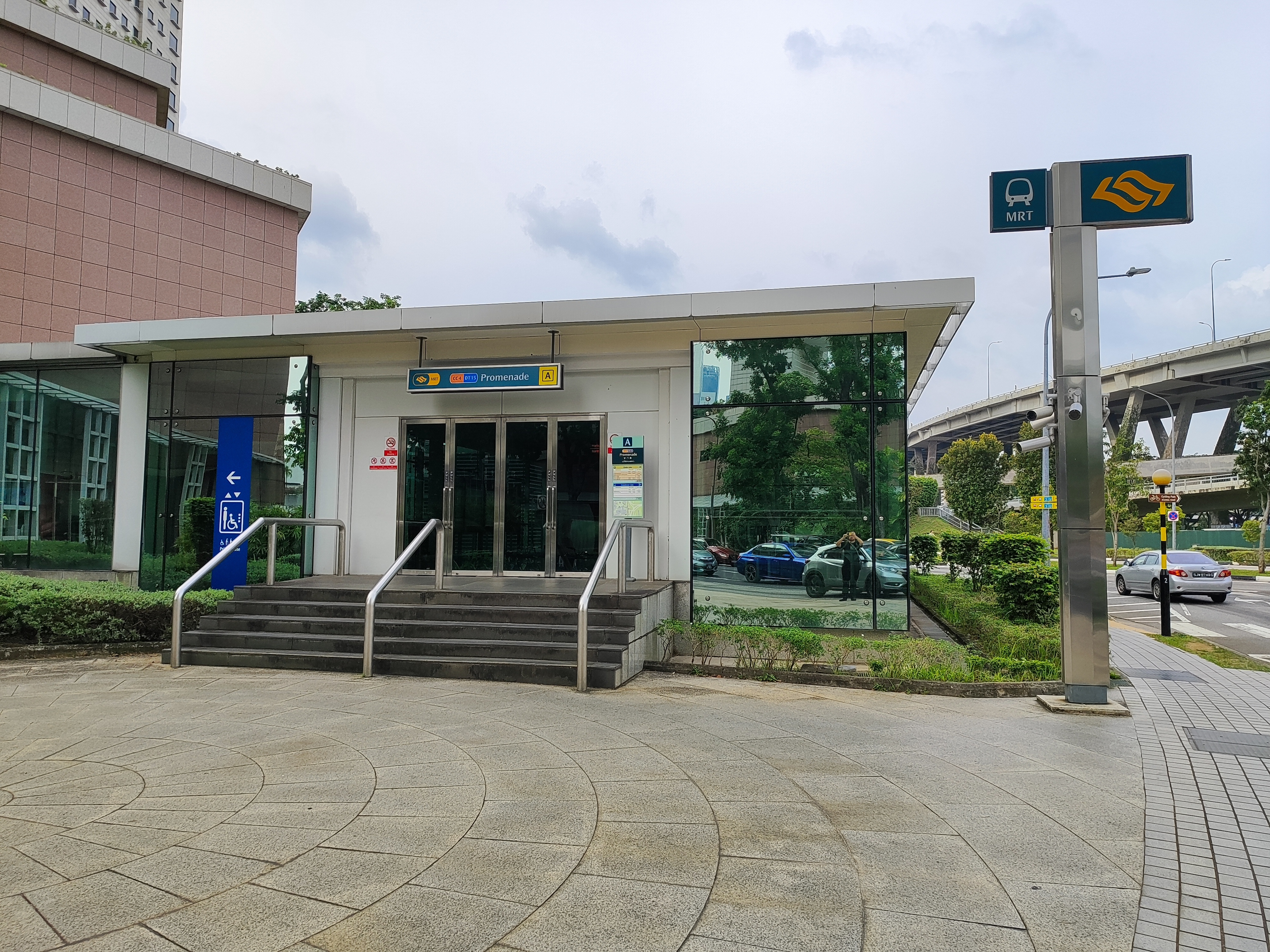
- Exit A of Promenade station

General information
- Location: 2 Temasek Avenue, Singapore 039193 (CCL); 10 Temasek Avenue, Singapore 039194 (DTL)
- Coordinates: 01°17′33″N 103°51′39″E
- System: Mass Rapid Transit (MRT) interchange
- Owner: Land Transport Authority
- Operator: SMRT Trains (Circle Line); SBS Transit (Downtown Line)
- Line: Circle Line Downtown Line
- Platforms: 4 (4 stacked platforms)
- Tracks: 4
- Connections: Bus, Taxi

Construction
- Structure type: Underground
- Depth: 42 metres (138 ft)
- Platform levels: 4
- Accessible: Yes

Other information
- Station code: PMN

History
- Opened: 17 April 2010; 16 years ago (Circle Line); 14 January 2012; 14 years ago (Circle Line Extension); 22 December 2013; 12 years ago (Downtown Line)
- Former names: Millenia, Marina Centre, Sheares

Passengers
- June 2024: 19,478 per day

Services
Preceding station	Mass Rapid Transit	Following station
Bayfront Clockwise	Circle Line	Nicoll Highway Anticlockwise
Esplanade towards Dhoby Ghaut	Circle Line	Nicoll Highway towards Prince Edward Road
Bugis towards Bukit Panjang	Downtown Line	Bayfront towards Expo
Track layout
Location
- Location within Singapore Rail central area

Promenade MRT station is an underground Mass Rapid Transit (MRT) interchange station on the Downtown (DTL) and Circle (CCL) lines in Downtown Core, Singapore. Located underneath Temasek Avenue and adjacent to Millenia Tower, the station serves several key attractions and locations such as Suntec City and the Marina Promenade, which the station is named after. The station is at the junction of the Dhoby Ghaut and Marina Bay branches of the CCL.

The station was first announced as Millenia MRT station in 1999 and was part of the Marina Line, which later became CCL Stage 1. It was later announced in 2005 that the CCL would branch off from this station to serve Chinatown, which eventually became DTL Stage 1 in 2007. The station opened on 17 April 2010 as part of the CCL Stages 1 and 2. On 14 January 2012, the CCL branch to Marina Bay via Bayfront station opened. The DTL platforms opened on 22 December 2013 as part of Downtown Line Stage 1. The DTL station is the second deepest station in the entire MRT network at 42 m (138 ft), behind Bencoolen station at 43 m (141 ft).

== History ==
=== Circle Line ===
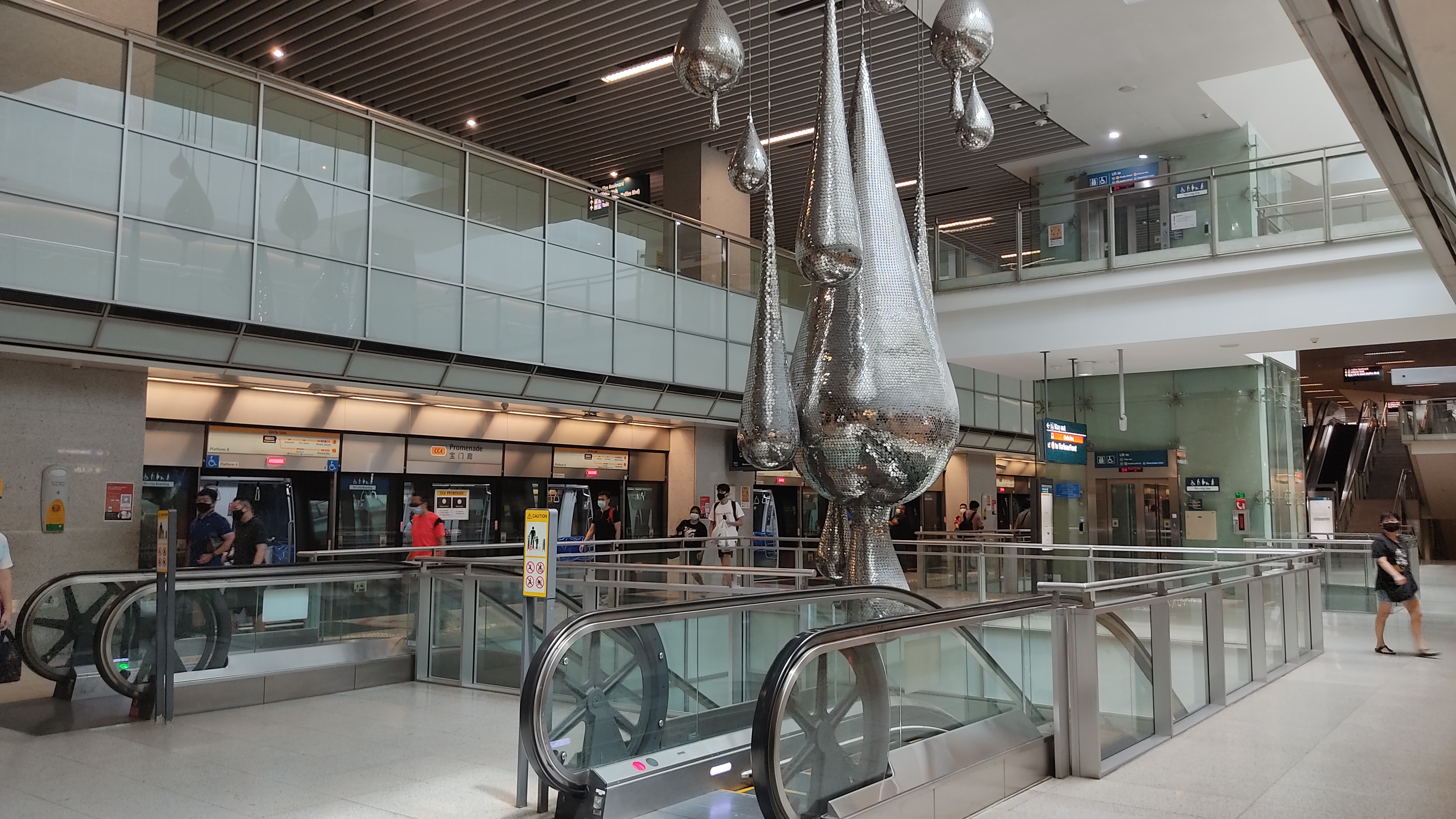
Platform B of Promenade station serving the CCL, with the artwork "Dreams in a Social Cosmic Odyssey" (D.I.S.C.O.) by PHUNK studios

The station was initially part of the Marina Line, serving between the Dhoby Ghaut and Stadium stations, which was later incorporated into the CCL Stage 1. Contract C825 for the design and construction of Millenia station (Note: the station's working name) and associated tunnels was awarded to a joint venture comprising Shanghai Tunnel Engineering Co. (Singapore) Pte Ltd, Woh Hup and NCC at a sum of S$343.94 million (US$191.96 million) on 19 December 2001. (Note: The contract also includes the construction of the Dhoby Ghaut, Bras Basah and Esplanade stations.)

In 2005, the station's name was finalised as Promenade, in light of its proximity to the Marina Promenade. Although Sheares garnered the most votes in the station names poll, it was decided that naming the station after the former president Benjamin Sheares was considered too 'prestigious' for one of the many underground MRT stations in Singapore and hence it was not named after him. During the station's construction, on 25 March 2003, a section of Rochor Road (from ECP to Suntec City) had to be realigned.

The station opened on 17 April 2010 along with the rest of Stages 1 and 2 of the Circle Line. Subsequently, the two-station 2.4 km (1.5-mile) extension from Promenade to Marina Bay station opened on 14 January 2012 as announced on 28 November 2011.

=== Downtown Line ===
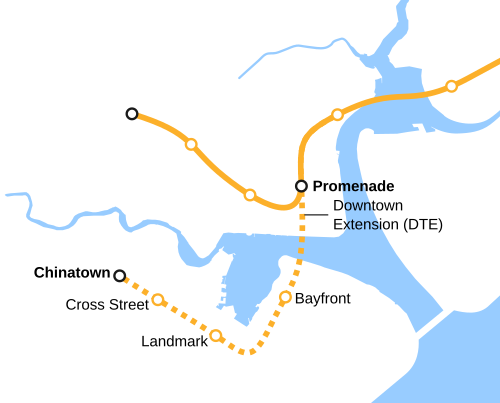
The original Downtown Extension

On 14 June 2005, the Land Transport Authority announced the 3.4 km (2.1-mile) Downtown extension that will branch off the CCL to serve the New Downtown at Marina Bay area. The DTE was later revised to be the first stage of the 40 km (25-mile) Downtown Line (DTL) in 2007.

Contract C902 for the design and construction of the Downtown Line station and its adjacent 1.2 km (0.75-mile) tunnels was awarded to Shanghai Tunnel Engineering Co. (Singapore) Pte Ltd at a contract sum of S$231.9 million (US$163.9 million) in August 2008. Portions of Temasek Avenue were realigned during the construction period to allow construction works to be carried out. The construction of the bored tunnels required the use of 6.35 m (20.8 ft) diameter Earth pressure balance (EPB) machines. The DTL station commenced operations on 22 December 2013.

== Station details ==
=== Location ===
Promenade station is located underneath Temasek Avenue and adjacent to Millenia Tower. The station also serves several key locations and attractions such as Suntec City, Singapore Flyer, The Float@Marina Bay and the Marina Bay Street Circuit. It is also close to the Marina Promenade after which the station is named.

=== Architecture ===
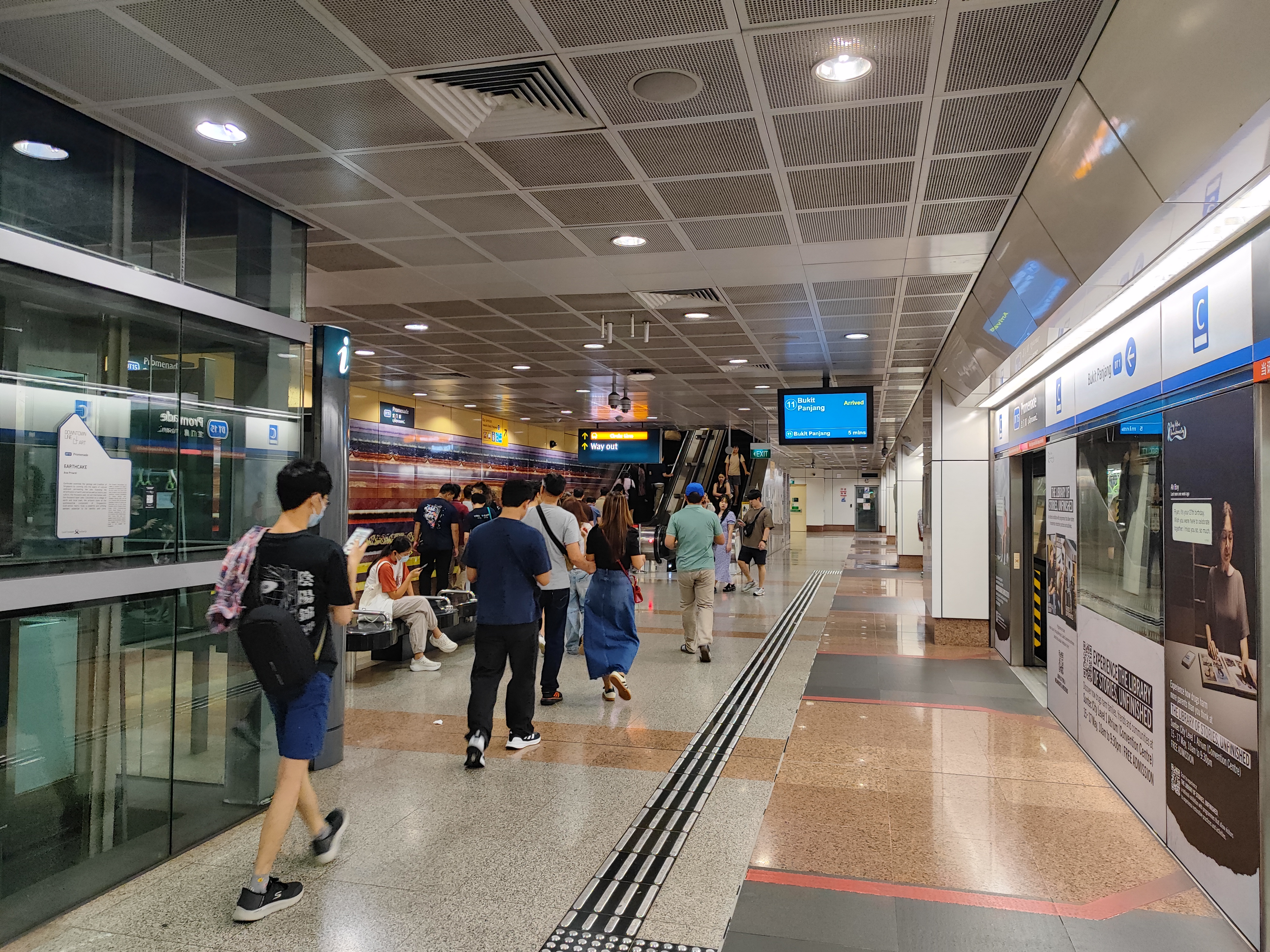
Platform C of Promenade station bound for Bukit Panjang station on the DTL, which is the 2nd deepest platform on the network

The station is designed by DP Architects. The station features a "curvilinear envelope with deep-edged metal louvres" to conceal the concrete service shafts and integrate with the vertically glazed skylights. The three entrances to the station have identical features of thin and sharp lines for the roof and glazed panels for the sides. The interior features a pattern of light grey and granite floors, with granite and stainless steel-trimmed panels on the walls and metal-grid ceilings.

Prior to the Nicoll Highway collapse, it was planned for the station, along with Nicoll Highway station, to have a cross-platform interchange with an unspecified future line; that line had to be realigned as the new Nicoll Highway station did not have provisions for the line. The DTL platform is at 42 m (138 ft) below ground, the second deepest platform in the entire MRT network behind Bencoolen station at 43 m (141 ft). The station also features one of the longest escalators on the MRT network, with the length being 17.56 m (57.6 ft).

=== Art in transit ===
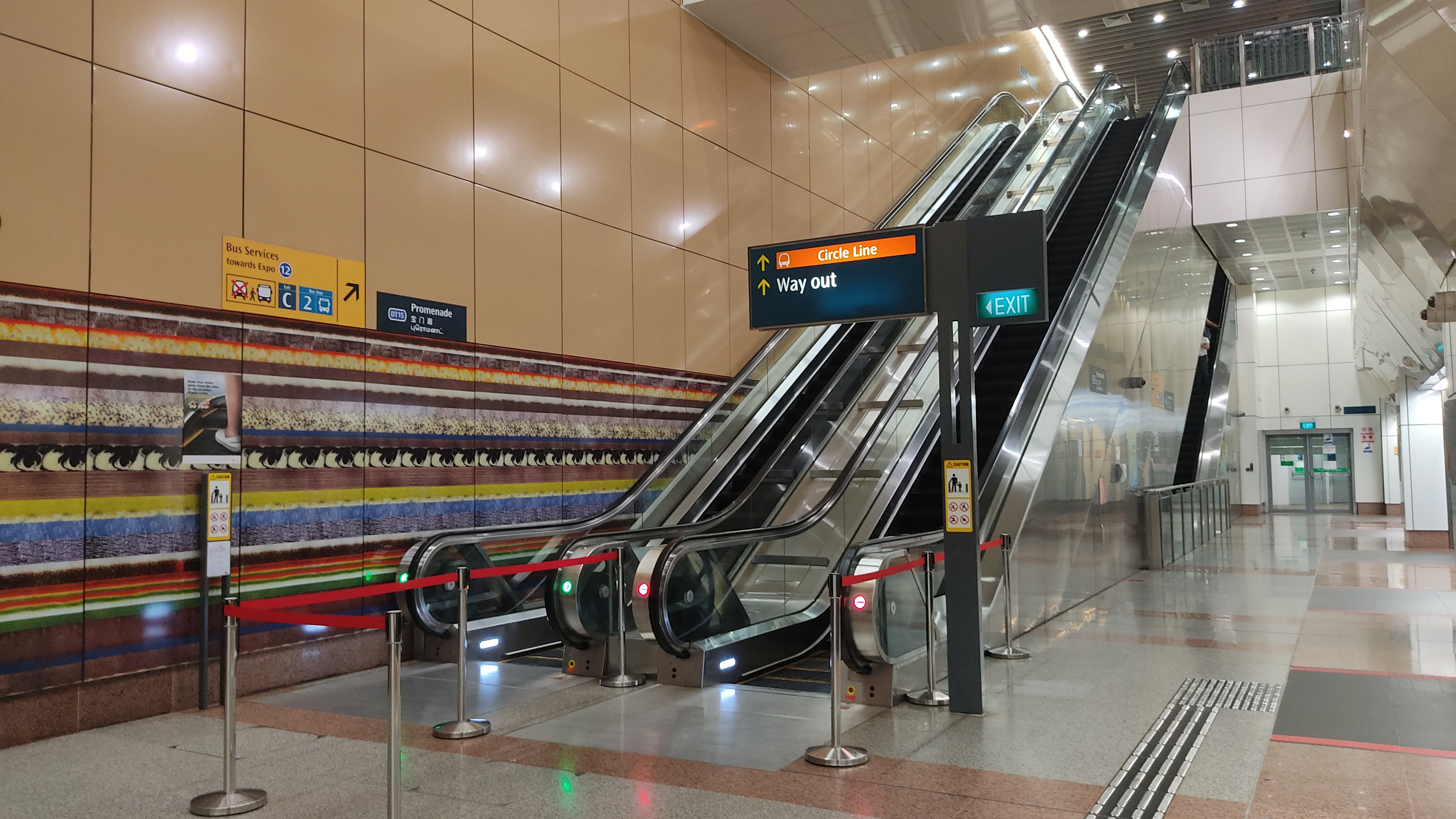
"Earthcake" by Ana Prvacki at DTL Platform D

Two artworks are featured at this station as part of the MRT network's Art-in-Transit Programme. At the CCL platforms, the artwork "Dreams in a Social Cosmic Odyssey" (D.I.S.C.O.) by PHUNK studios features huge metallic droplets suspended from the ceiling, to represent an "illuminated celebration of collective dreams". The droplets reflect the sunlight from above, creating a moving kaleidoscope on the station floors. These waves of light illustrate the "ebb and flow" commuter traffic and allow the interaction of passengers in transit with the art piece.

The four artists – Alvin Tan, Melvin Chee, Jackson Tan and William Chan – decided to make use of the skylight such that the artwork becomes a key feature of the station, instead of creating a mural on the station wall. Initially, it was planned to hang a chandelier made up silhouettes of human figures representing how "People illuminates Life", but was considered by the Art-in-Transit panel as "too literal". Inspired by the station's proximity to the Marina Bay Reservoir and Kallang Basin, the artists decided to use water droplets for the artwork.

At the DTL platforms, an artwork "Earthcake" by Ana Prvacki depicts the multiple layers of Singapore's geology, history, culture, growth and development through the tiers of cultural sediment permeating the area. The artwork, intended to be a "collage of earth and local desserts”, also bears similarity with one of the colourful local kuehs, reflecting Singapore's multi-culturalism centred on food. According to Prvacki, she was inspired by the core samples from the site taken during the station's construction and saw its visual similarities with the local kueh. The DTL artwork has drawn mixed reactions from other artists. Yek Wong, painter of the artwork at one-north station, was critical of the artwork, saying the artwork is "too trapped in philosophical mumbo jumbo". On the other hand, Jason Ong, the artist behind the artwork at HarbourFront, finds the layers and repetition of the artwork appealing and was intrigued by the "conceptual link" between the dessert and the stratification of the ground.

=== Platforms (Gallery) ===
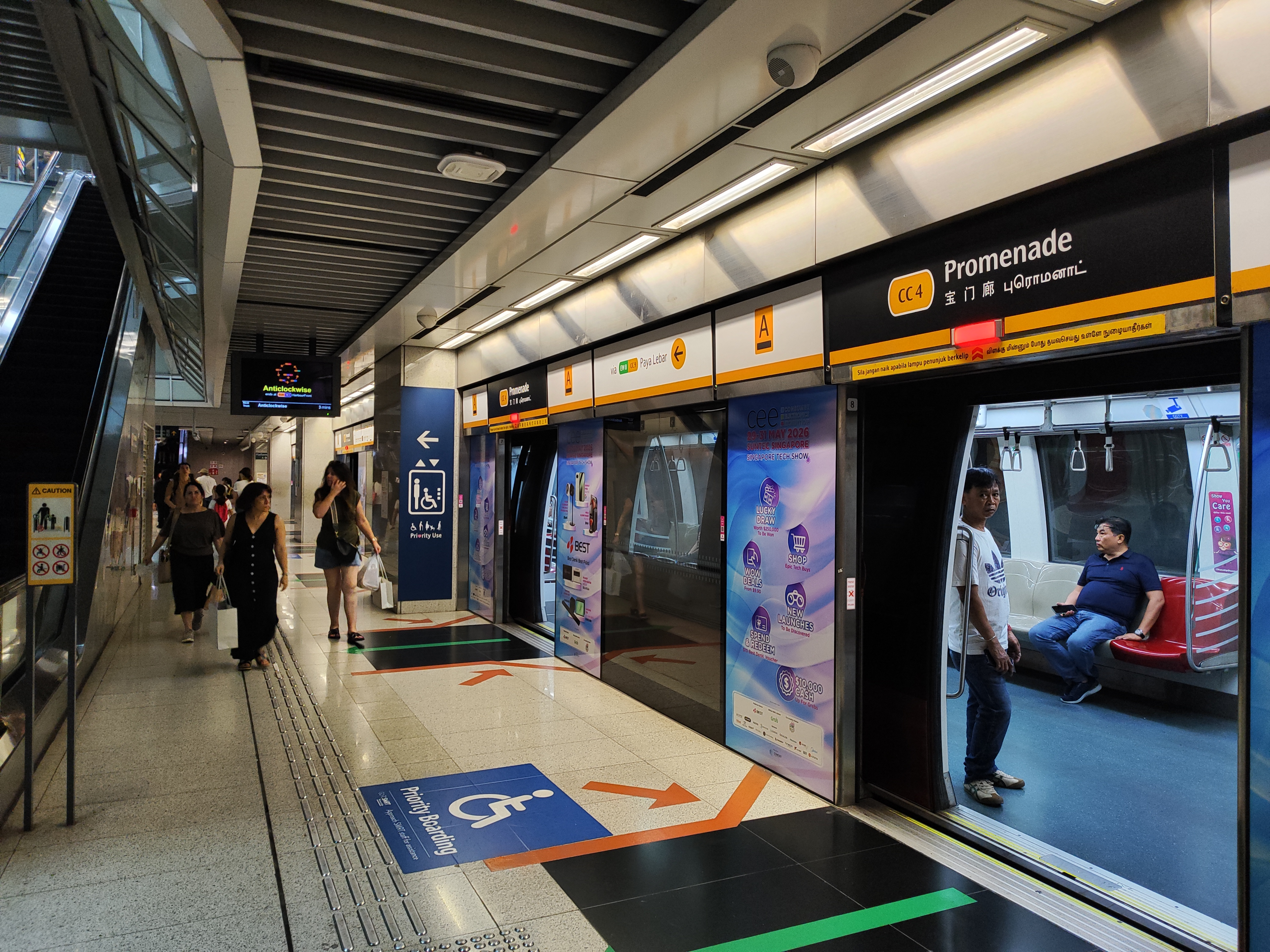
Platform A (Circle Line)

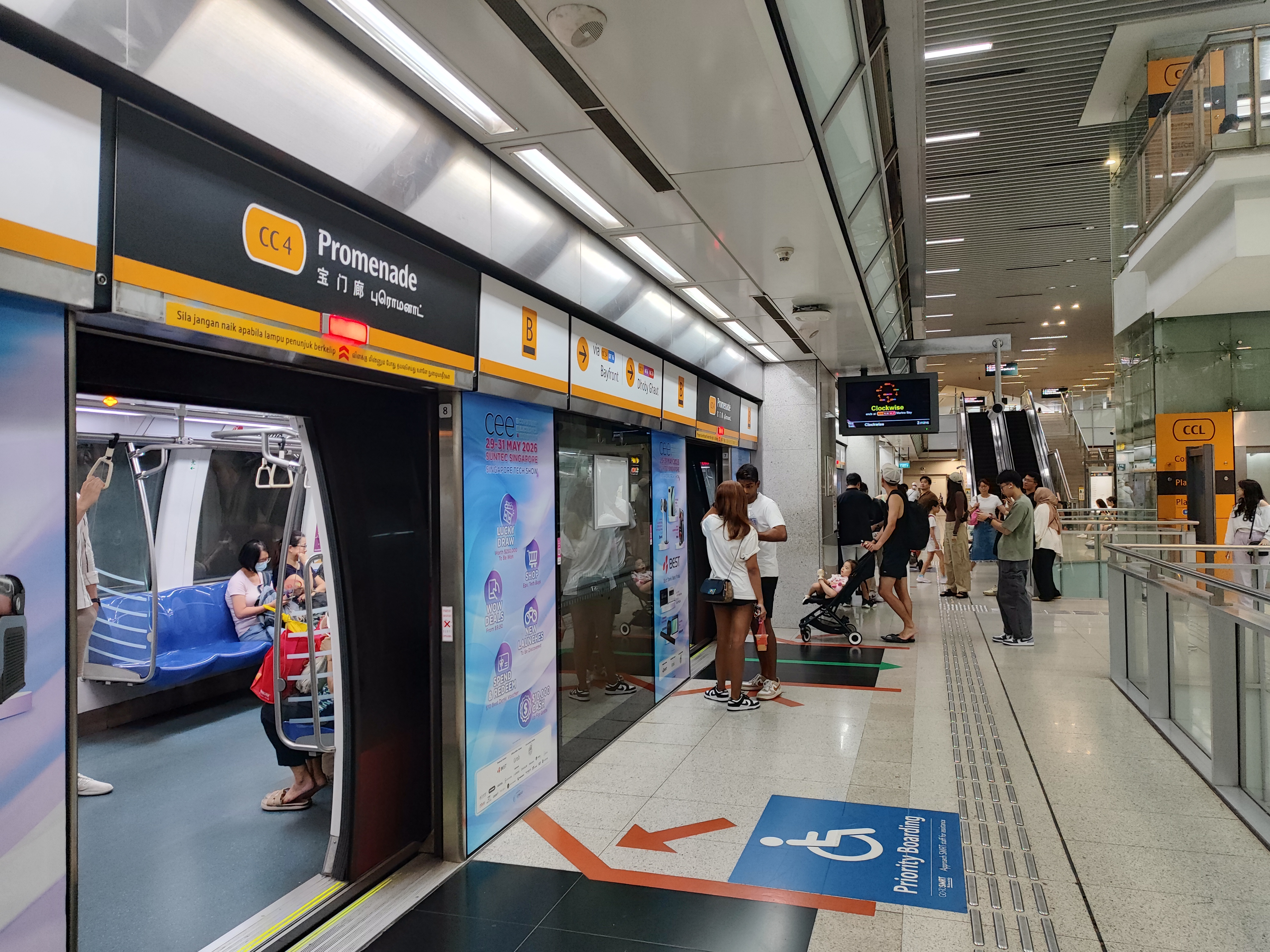
Platform B (Circle Line)

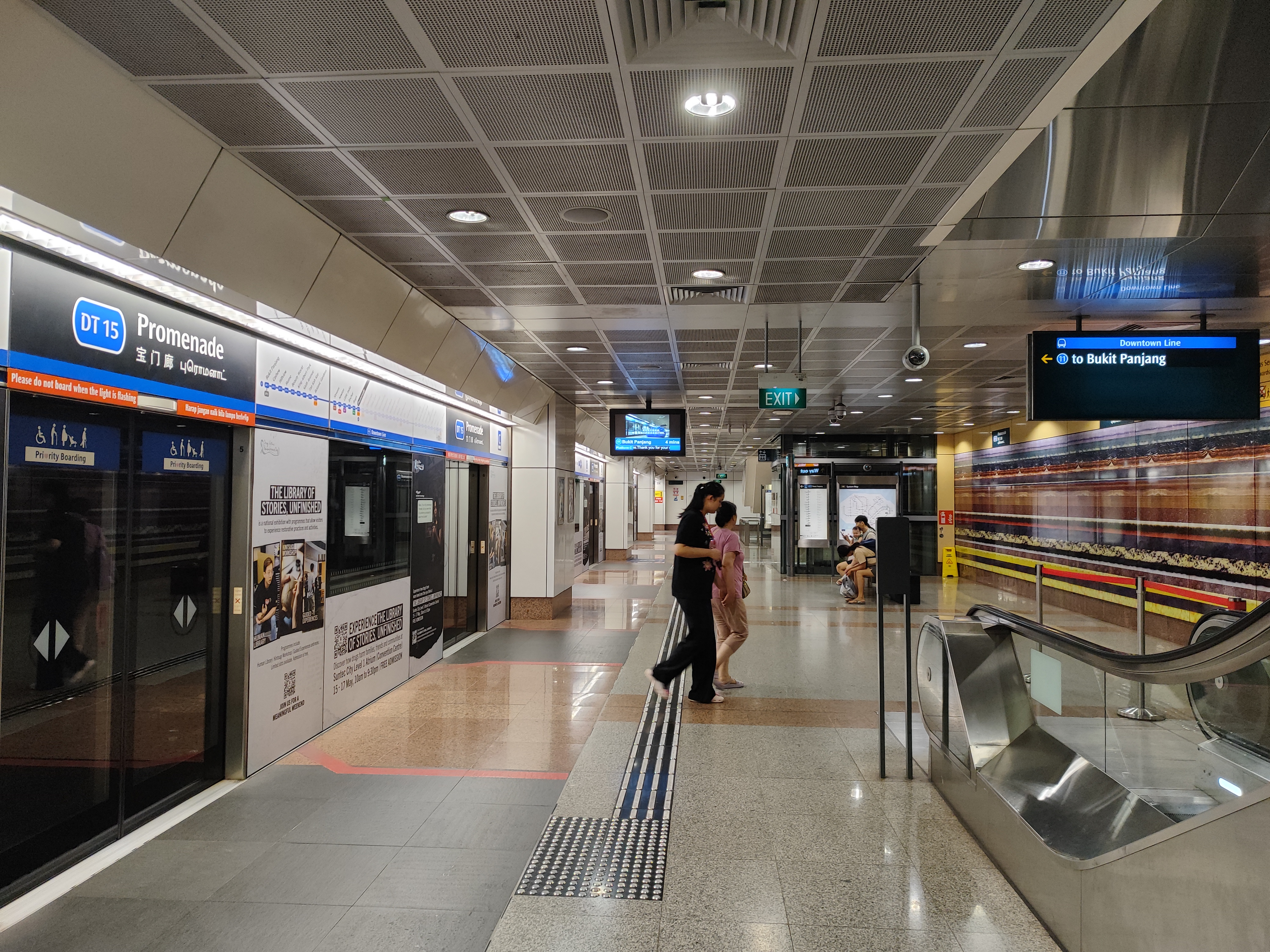
Platform C (Downtown Line)

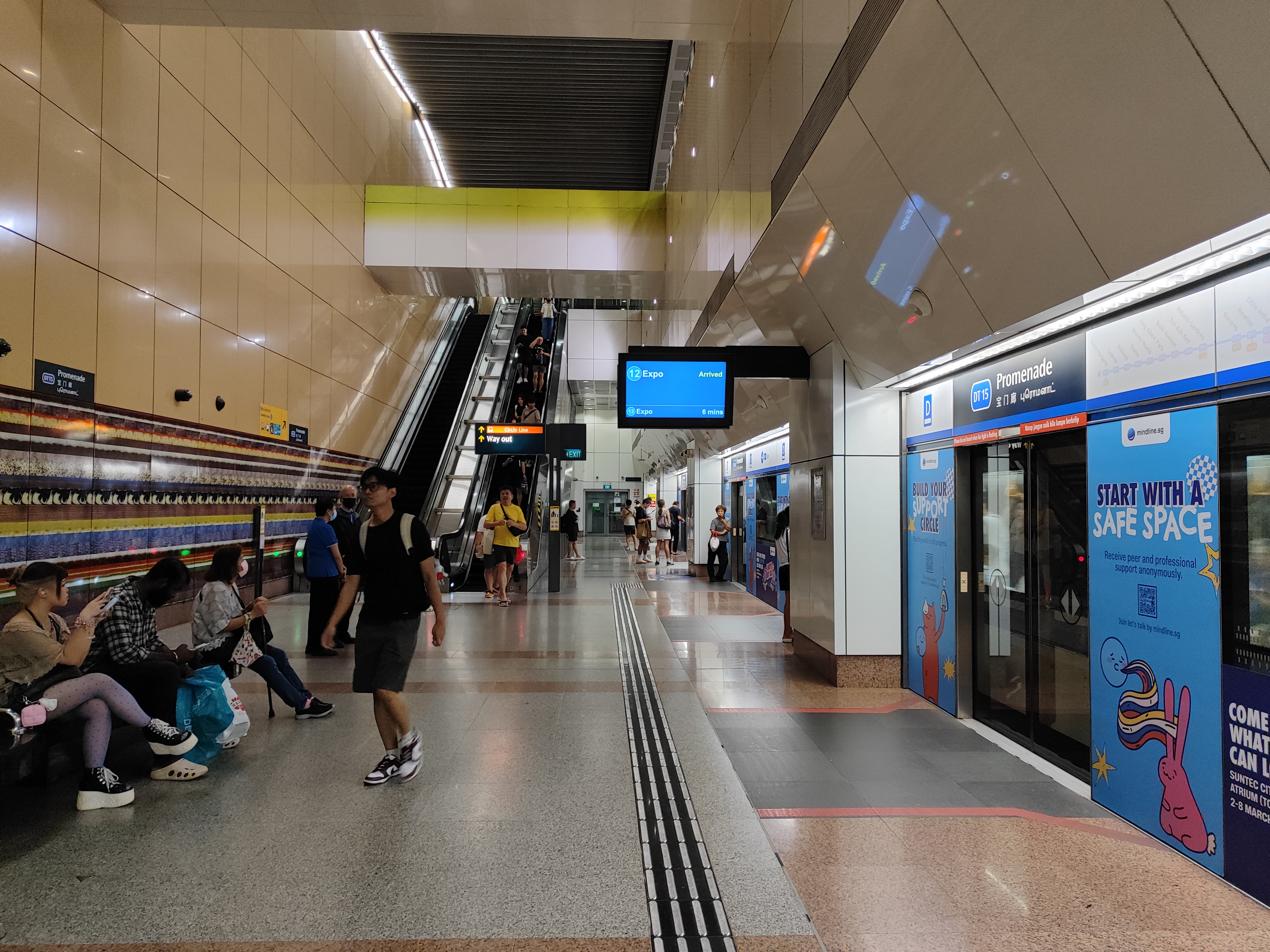
Platform D (Downtown Line)
