= Millenia Tower =

Office skyscraper in Singapore

- 美年大厦
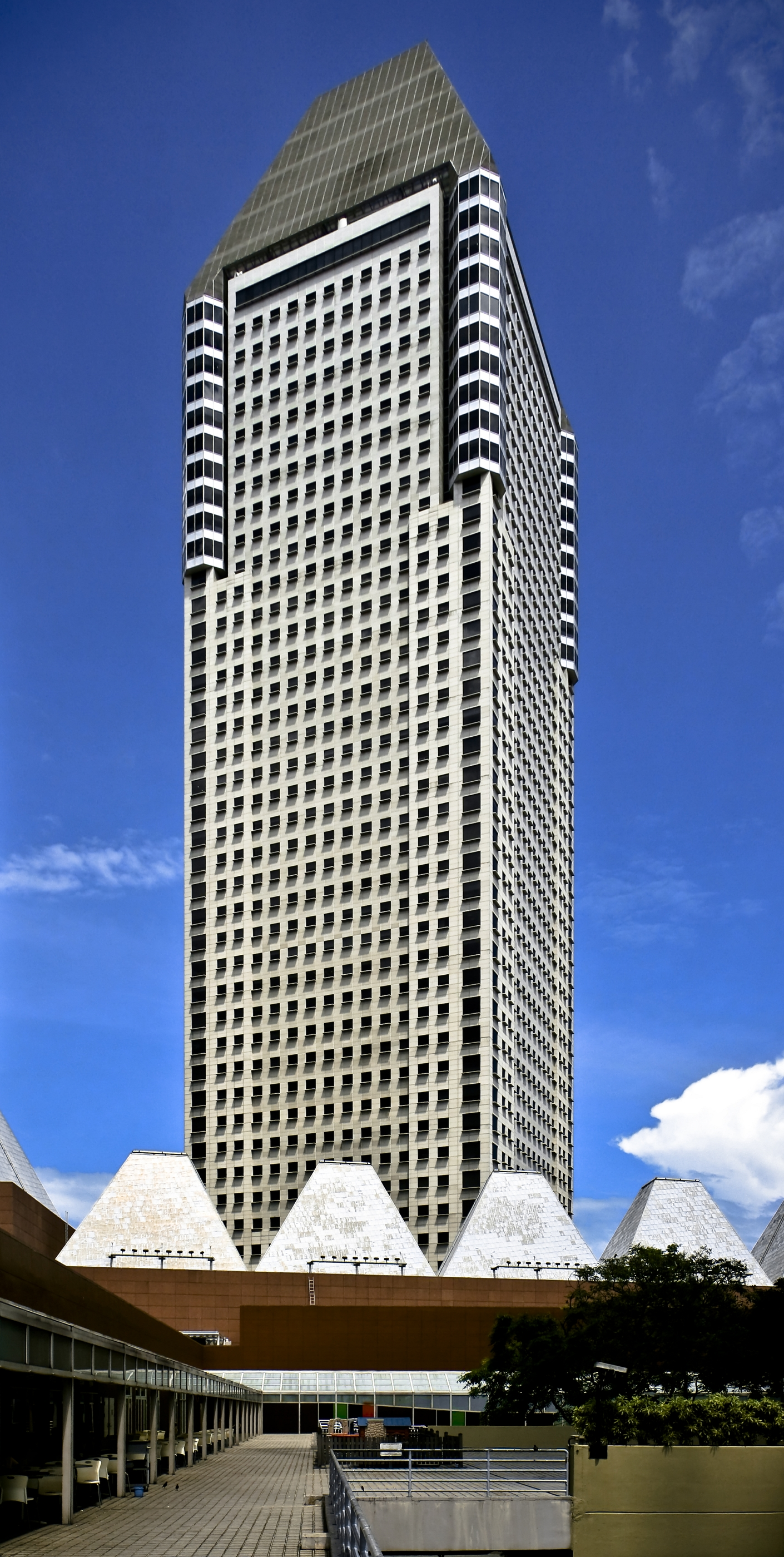
- Interactive map of the Millenia Tower area

General information
- Type: Commercial offices
- Location: 1 Temasek Avenue; Singapore 039192
- Coordinates: 1.292778°N 103.860278°E
- Construction started: 1992; 34 years ago
- Completed: 1996; 30 years ago
- Cost: S$300 Million
- Owner: Kwee brothers' Pontiac Land Group
- Operator: Pontiac Marina Pte Ltd.

Height
- Roof: 218 m (715 ft)

Technical details
- Floor count: 41; 2 below ground

Design and construction
- Architect: Kevin Roche
- Developer: Kwee brothers' Pontiac Marina Pte Ltd.
- Structural engineer: Meinhardt
- Main contractor: Dragages Singapore Pte Ltd

Millenia Tower is a 218-metre (715 ft), 41-storey skyscraper at Marina Centre in Singapore, next to Promenade MRT station. The building is located in Millenia Singapore and is the tallest building of the development.

== Arts and architecture ==
It is designed by Pritzker Prize laureate Kevin Roche. The square footprint rests on four illuminated cylinders which in turn frames a striking glass lobby. The tower is crowned with a massive pyramidal roof which is the tallest focal point of the entire development.

At the five storey tall lobby is a spectacular mural entitled “Rising” by artist Frank Stella. Millenia Tower also houses the giant pumpkin sculpture by Yayoi Kusama, one of the world's most influential artists.

== Services and amenities ==
- In-house property management with security, housekeeping, technicians, etc.
- Millenia Concierge by Conrad Centennial Singapore, offers hotel concierge service to office tenants.

== See also ==
- List of tallest buildings in Singapore
