= Kwee family (Pontiac) =

Singaporean business family

Kwee Family
- Current region: Singapore
- Origin: Singapore
- Founder: Henry Kwee
- Heirlooms: Pontiac Land Group
- Website: http://www.pontiacland.com/

The Kwee family is a Singaporean family that owns the Pontiac Land Group, a privately-held luxury real estate developer, owner and operator based in Singapore. The Kwee brothers, Kwee Liong Keng, Kwee Liong Tek, Kwee Liong Seen and Kwee Liong Phing are currently shareholders of the Group.

== Family overview ==
Henry Kwee Hian Liong (郭贤良 in Chinese), father of the Kwee brothers, was a Chinese-Indonesian textile trader and real estate developer who migrated from Yuxi Town Fuqing City, Fujian Province, China, to Singapore in 1958. He founded Kwee Inc. Pte Ltd in 1959 and the Pontiac Land Group (PLG) in 1961. Henry Kwee died in 1988.

Kwee Liong Keng is the eldest of the Kwee brothers and served as the Managing Director of PLG until 2024. Kwee Liong Keng is married to Chua Lee Eng, from the Chua family that founded Cycle and Carriage. He also was Singapore's Non-Resident Ambassador to Poland, among other public service positions. Kwee Liong Tek served as Chairman of the Group until 2024. Kwee Liong Seen and Kwee Liong Phing were directors of PLG until 2024. Both Kwee Liong Tek and Kwee Liong Seen are alumni of Haas School of Business at the University of California, Berkeley.

The Kwee brothers via Pontiac Land Group own several luxury hotels in Singapore including Conrad Singapore Orchard, The Ritz-Carlton, Millenia Singapore, Conrad Singapore Marina Bay, and Capella Singapore, as well as office towers, Millenia Tower, Centennial Tower and Millenia Walk shopping mall. PLG also developed and manages Camden Medical Centre, and owns luxury residential residences, including Ardmore Residence, HANA, and The Colonnade.

In October 2013, the Kwee brothers agreed to provide $300 million in equity, supported by an $860 million loan from a consortium of Asian banks to enable the 53 West 53 development in New York City. This is PLG's first major foray outside of Singapore amidst the tightening property market on the island state. In the Maldives, the Kwees developed the Fari Islands archipelago, which is home to two luxury hotels – The Ritz-Carlton Maldives, Fari Islands, and Patina Maldives, Fari Islands.

PLG expanded into Australia by restoring two of Sydney’s historic sandstone buildings. The first phase, Capella Sydney, opened in March 2023 within the former Department of Education building. The second phase, The Lands by Capella, housed in the former Department of Lands and is slated to open progressively in 2026, transforming the historic building into an approximately 10,000 square metres destination for luxury retail, F&B, boutique workspaces, and event spaces. Together, these two landmark heritage buildings form The Sandstone Precinct, one of the largest privately funded tourism infrastructure developments in New South Wales.

In May 2024, PLG underwent a formal leadership transition with a board reconstitution. The four second-generation Kwee brothers transitioned from their positions as directors to advisory roles, paving way for the third generation, comprising Melissa Kwee, Kwee Ker-Wei, Philip Kwee and Kwee Ker Fong, to assume strategic Board responsibilities. Peter Ong was appointed as the Group’s independent Chairman, joined by independent directors, Moses Lee and Andrew Ang.

Evan Kwee, son of Kwee Liong Tek and maternal grandson of George Aratani, serves as Vice Chairman of Capella Hotel Group, and is married to Claudia Sondakh. His older sister Melissa Kwee is a social activist and was Chief Executive Officer of the National Volunteer & Philanthropy Centre in Singapore. She is currently a director at Pontiac Land Group.

According to Forbes, the Kwee family has a net worth of $7.3 billion, as of September 2025. The Kwee brothers reside in Singapore. The family supports educational causes, arts and cultural causes, social causes and humanitarian causes.
