= Marina Centre =

Marina Central
- Subzone of Downtown Core Planning Area
- Marina Central

Name transcription(s)
  - Chinese: 滨海中心
  - Malay: Marina Pusat
  - Tamil: மரினா சென்டர்
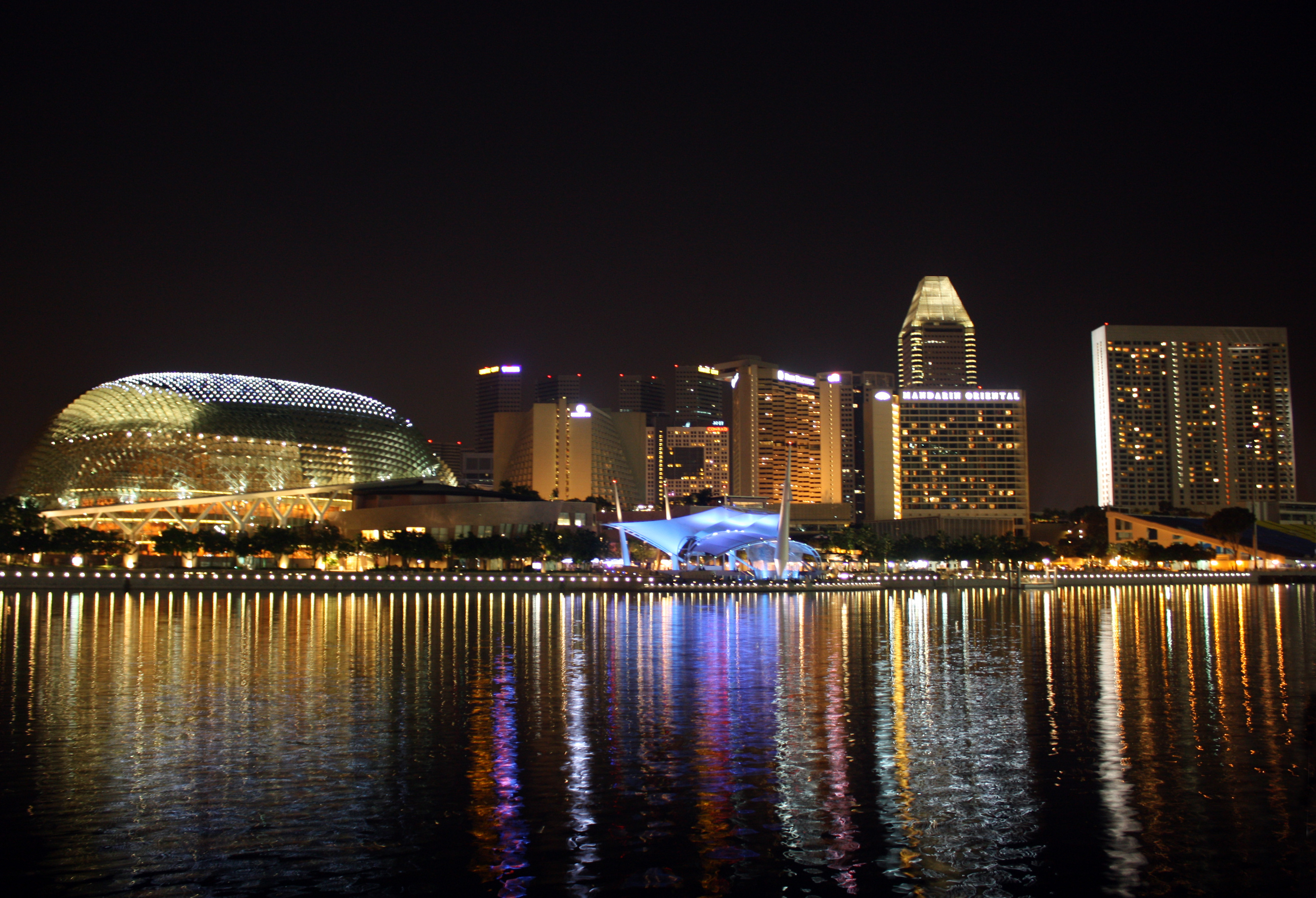
- Marina Central, with Marina Bay in the foreground.
- Interactive map of Marina Central
- Coordinates: 1.291°N 103.86°E
- Country: Singapore

Government
  - Members of Parliament: Jalan Besar GRC: Denise Phua; Josephine Teo

Marina Central or Marina Centre (Chinese: 滨海中心; Malay: Marina Pusat) is a zone of reclaimed land within the Downtown Core in the southern part of Singapore. Together with the Marina South area, it encloses the sheltered Marina Bay.

Suntec City, Marina Square, Millenia Walk, Esplanade – Theatres on the Bay and South Beach Tower are located within Marina Central.

== Hotels ==
- Marina Mandarin Singapore - managed by Meritus Hotels & Resorts
- Mandarin Oriental Singapore - formerly The Oriental Singapore
- The Pan Pacific Singapore
- Raffles Hotel Singapore
- Fairmont Singapore - formerly Raffles The Plaza, prior to that Westin Plaza
- Swissotel The Stamford - formerly Westin Stamford
- The Ritz-Carlton Millenia Singapore
- Conrad Centennial Singapore
- JW Marriott Hotel Singapore South Beach
- The Capitol Kempinski Hotel Singapore

== Shopping malls ==
- Marina Square
- Suntec City Mall
- CityLink Mall
- Raffles City Shopping Centre

== See also ==
- Millenia Singapore
