= Downtown Core =

- Planning area

Other transcription(s)
  - Chinese: 市中心
  - Malay: Pusat Bandar
  - Tamil: டவுன்டவுன் கோர்
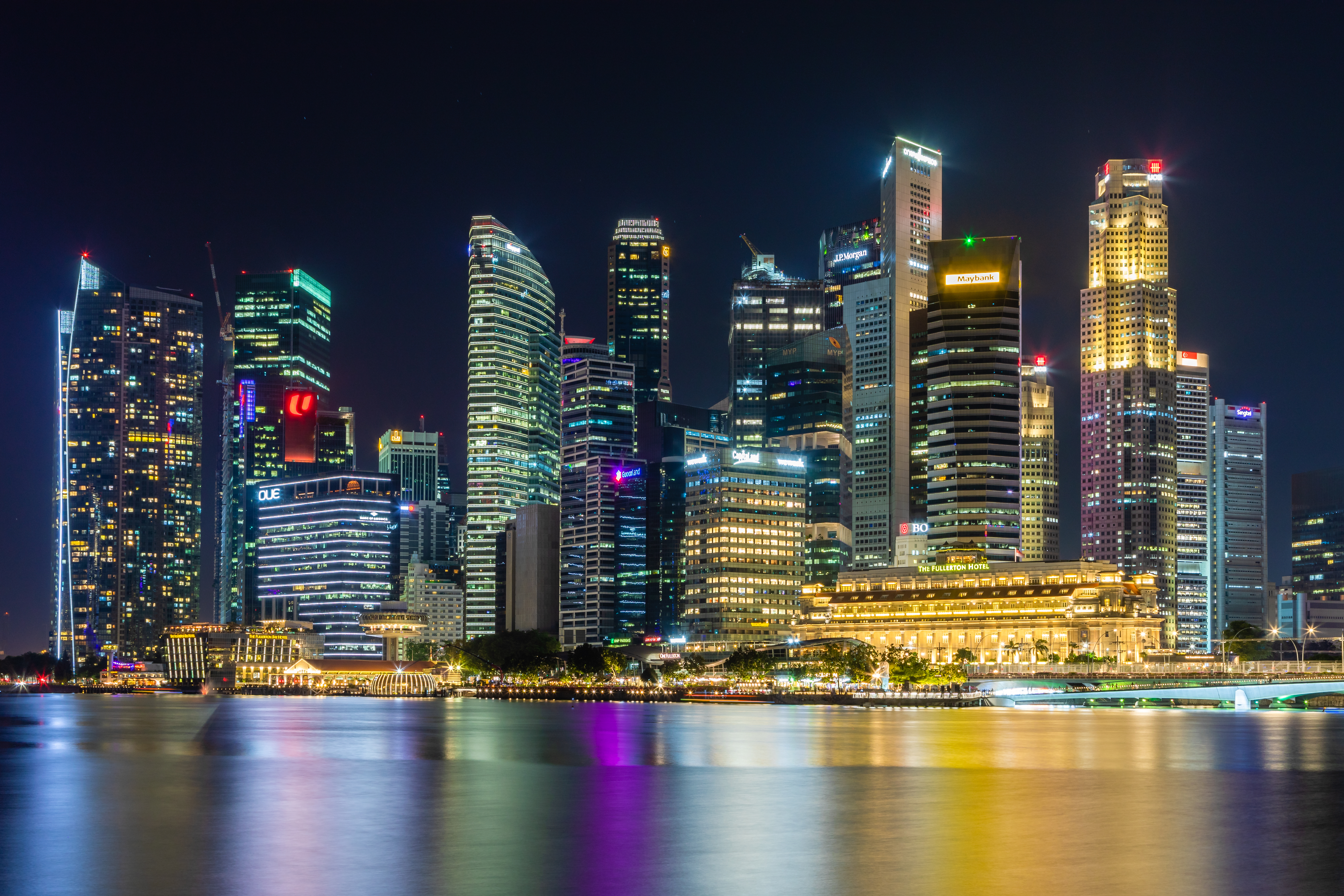
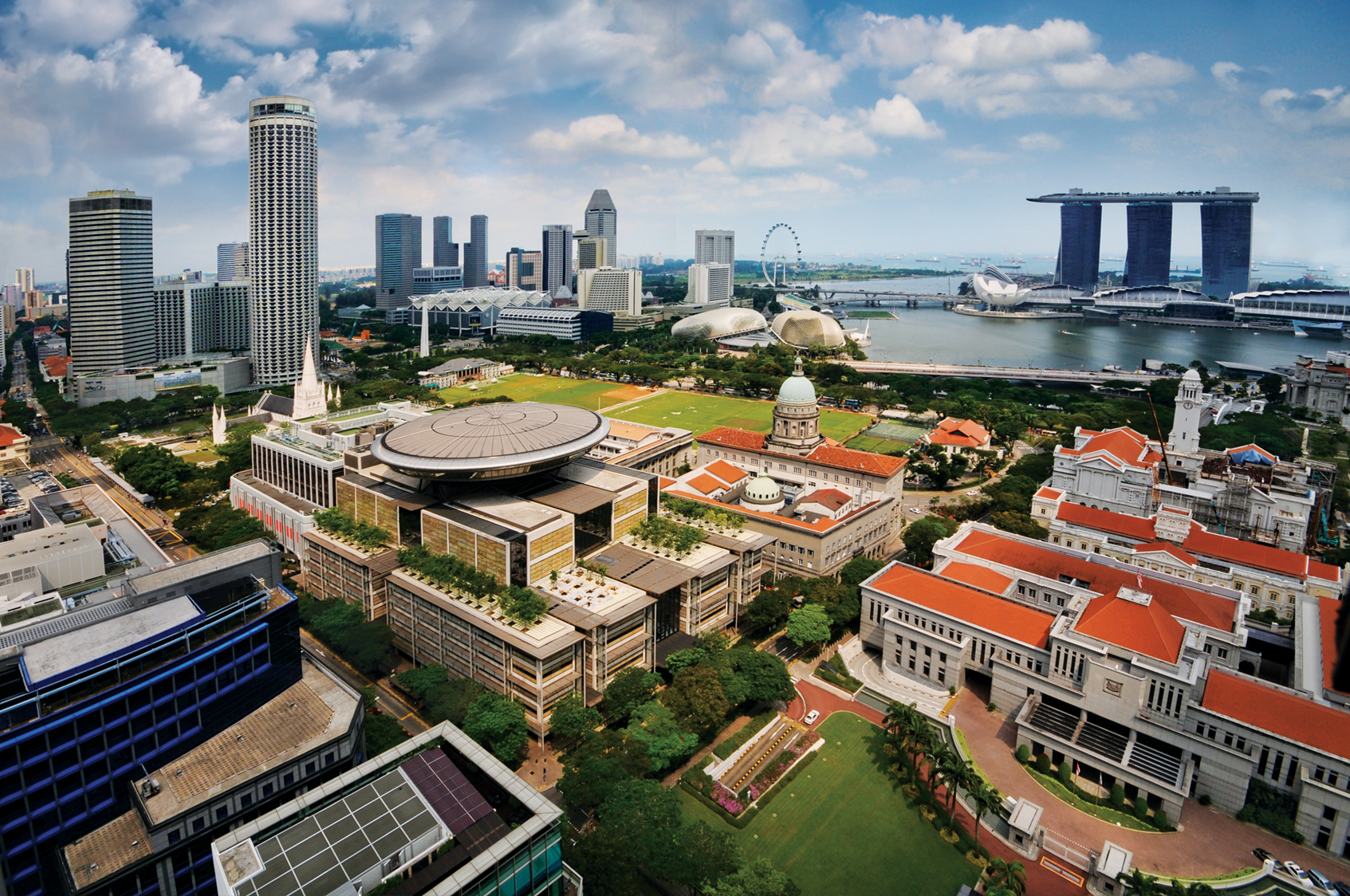
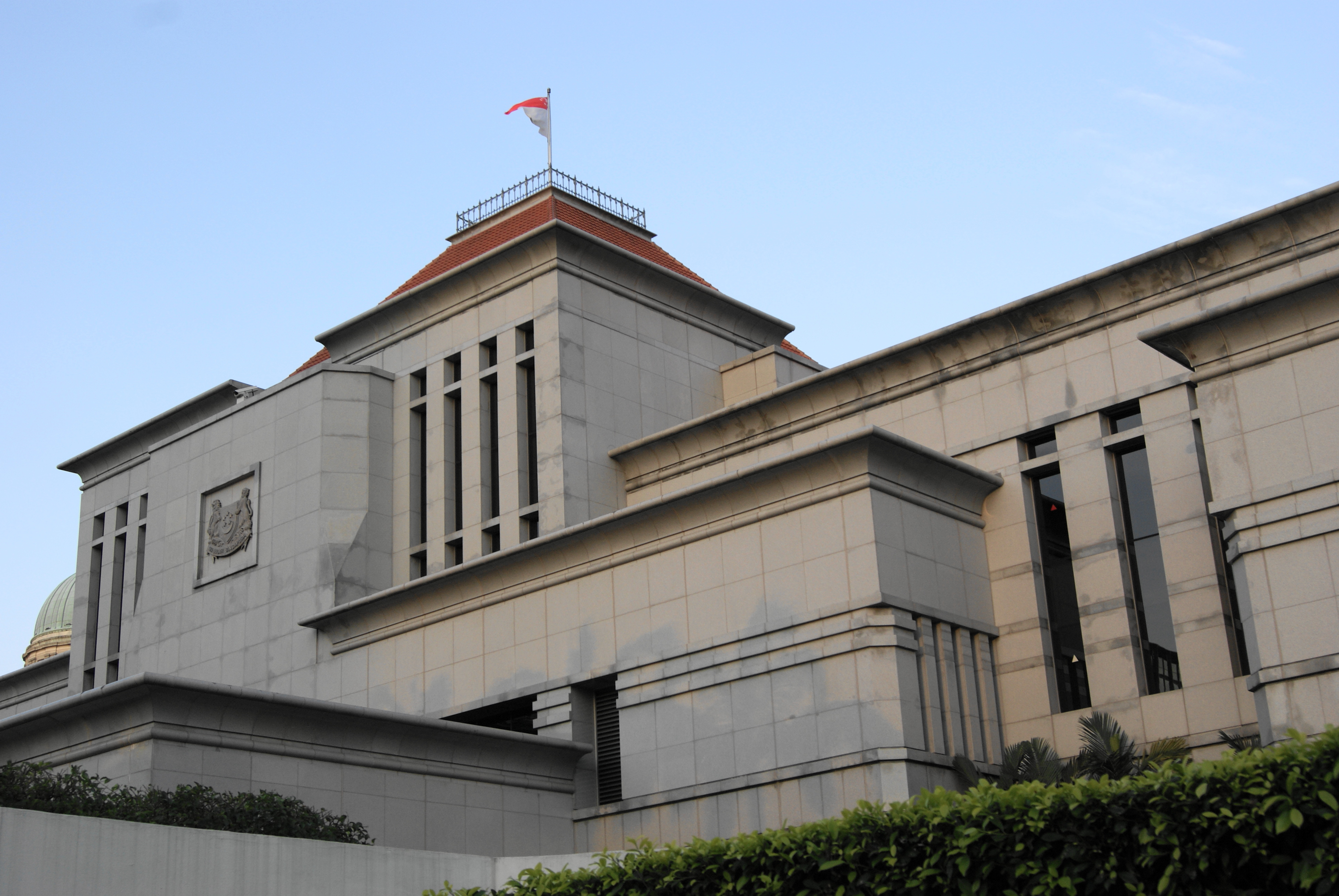
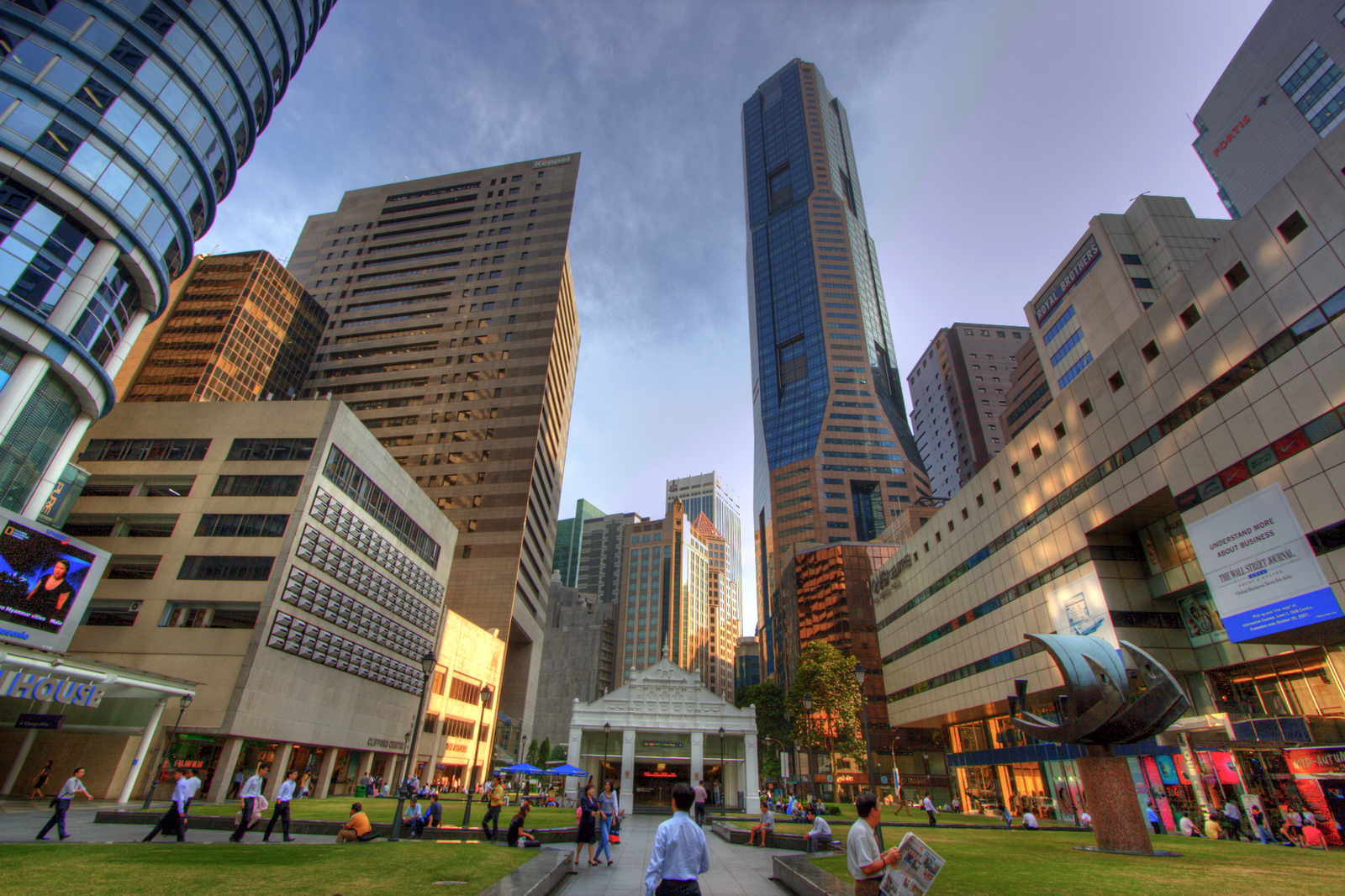
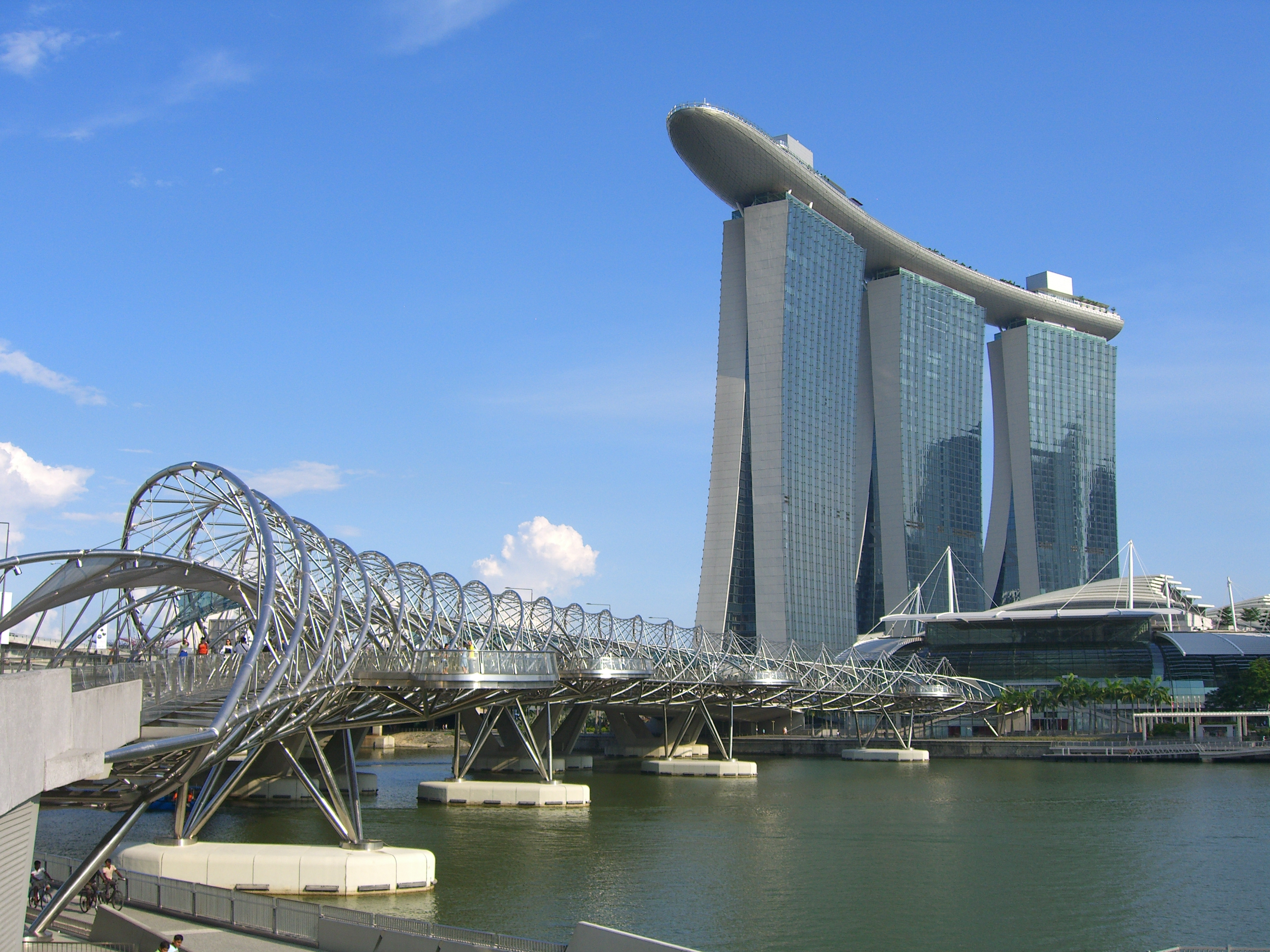
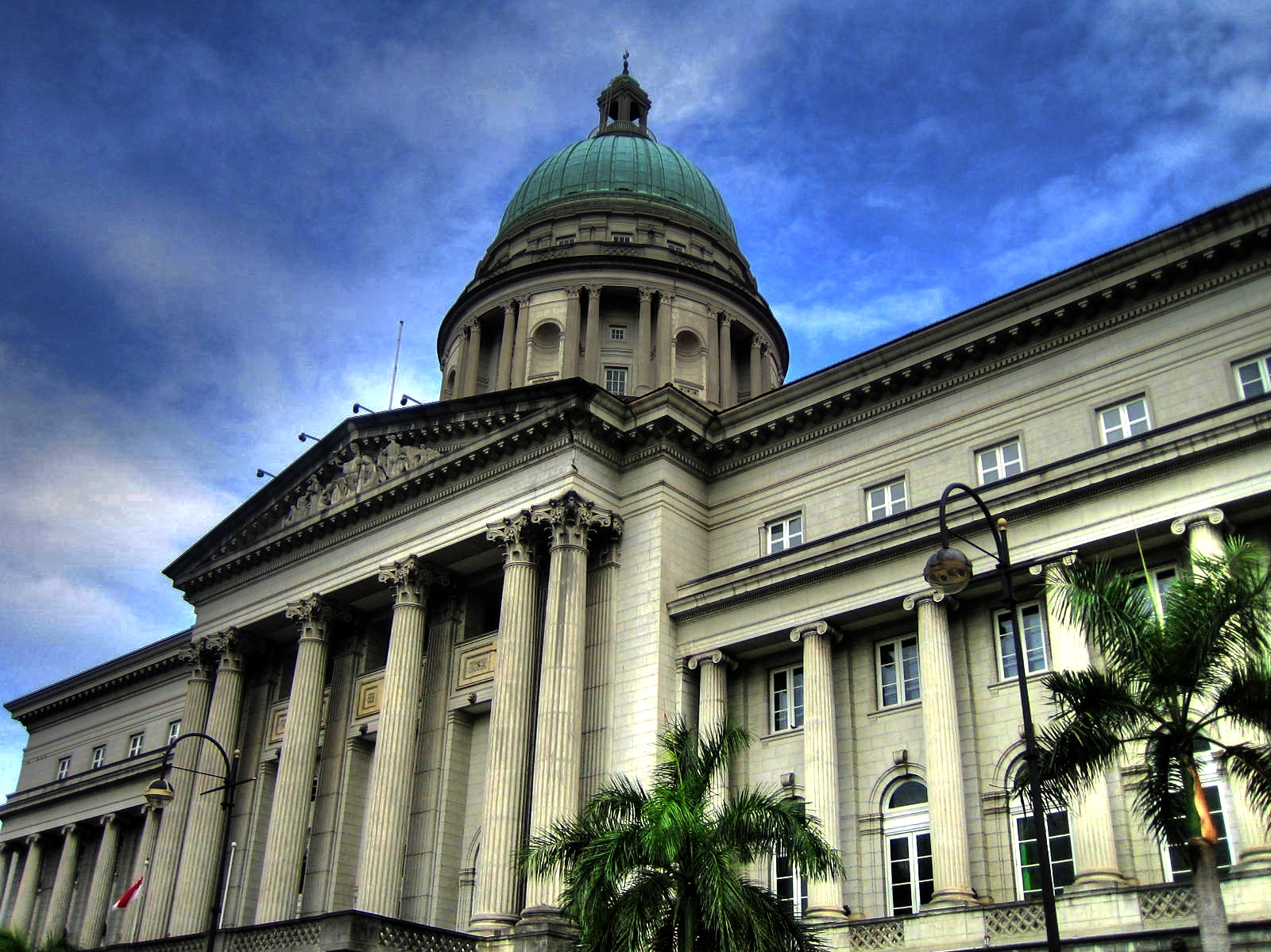
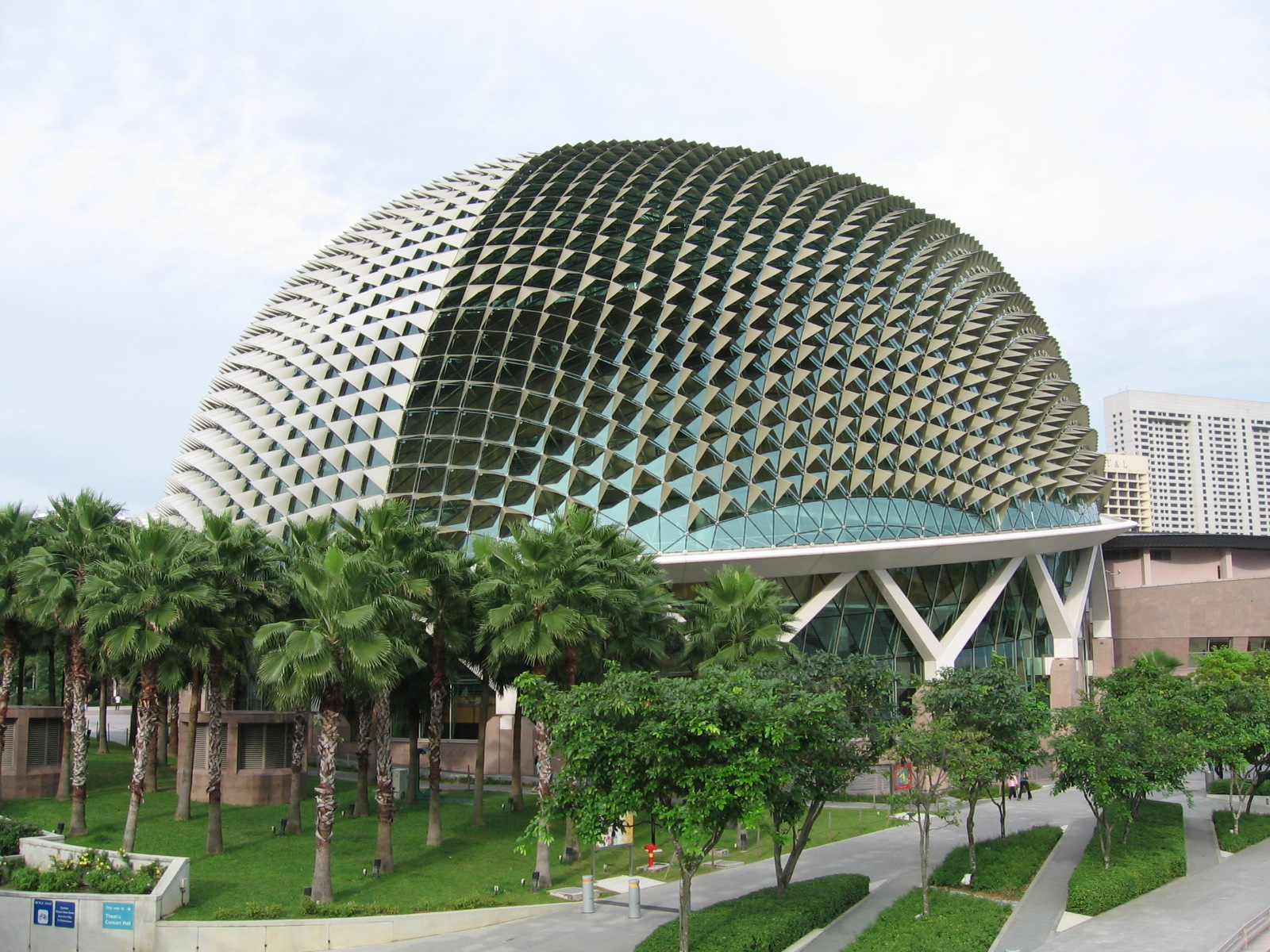
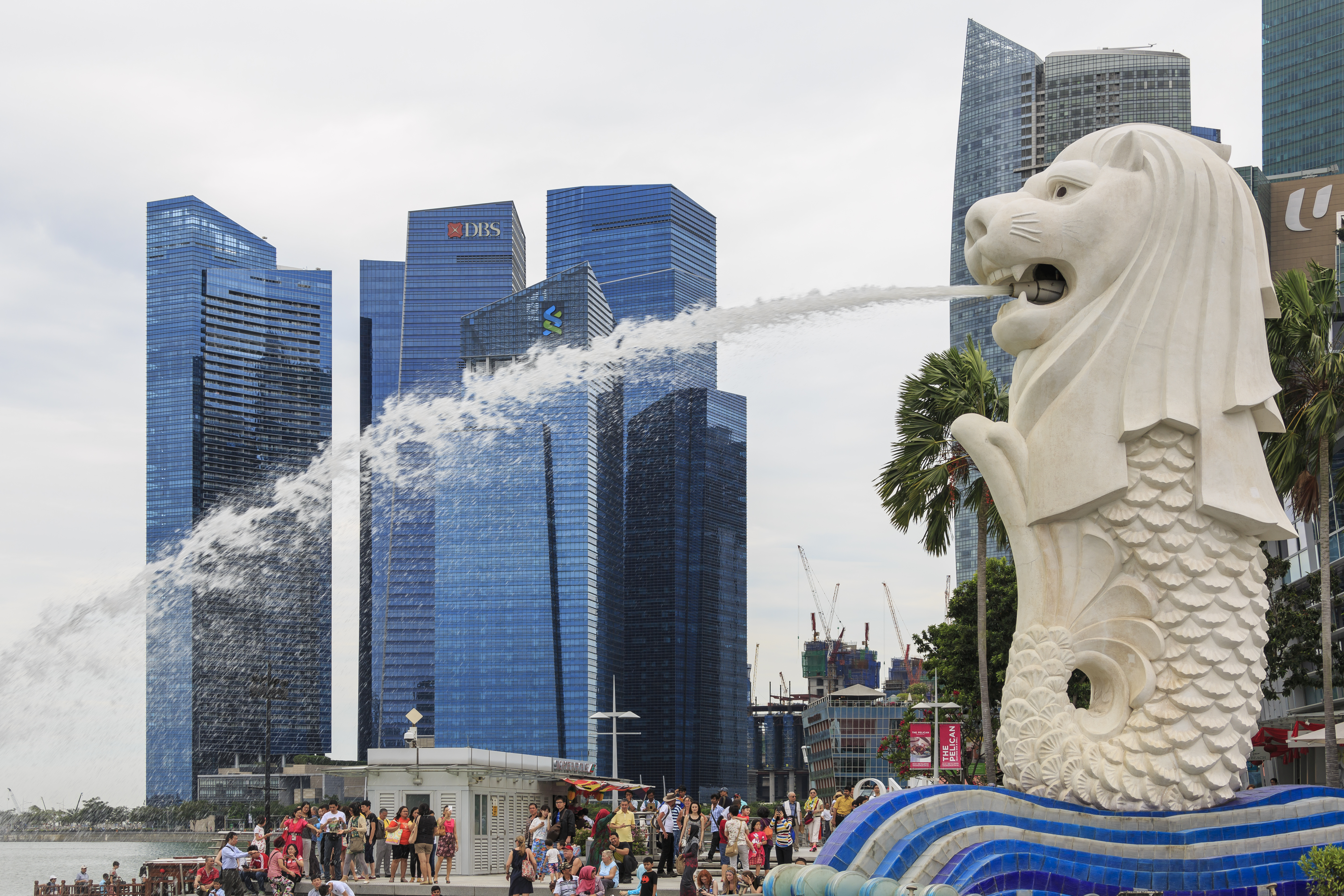
- Skyline of Singapore's Downtown Core Civic District Parliament House Raffles Place Helix Bridge with Marina Bay Sands in the background Old Supreme Court Building Theatres on the Bay The Merlion with the Marina Bay Financial Centre in the background

- Location in Central Region
- Interactive map of Downtown Core
- Downtown Core within Singapore Downtown Core (Asia) Downtown Core (Earth)
- Coordinates: 1°17′12″N 103°51′13″E
- Country: Singapore
- Region: Central Region
- CDC: Central Singapore CDC
- Town council: Jalan Besar Town Council; Tanjong Pagar Town Council
- Constituency: Jalan Besar GRC; Tanjong Pagar GRC
- 1st DGP exhibited: 1995
- 2nd DGP exhibited: 1997
- PA incorporated: 22 January 1999

Government
  - Mayor: Central Singapore CDC: Denise Phua
  - Members of Parliament: Jalan Besar GRC: Denise Phua; Josephine Teo; Tanjong Pagar GRC: Foo Cexiang

Area
  - Total: 5.08 km^{2} (1.96 sq mi)
  - Rank: 44th

Population (2026)
  - Total: 6,230
  - Rank: 33rd
  - Density: 1,230/km^{2} (3,180/sq mi)
  - Rank: 35th

Ethnic groups
  - Chinese: 2,970
  - Malays: 40
  - Indians: 320
  - Others: 390
- Postal district: 1, 6, 7

The Downtown Core is the historic urban centre of Singapore and the country's primary commercial district. It contains the main central business district (CBD), with a high concentration of skyscrapers in Raffles Place, Tanjong Pagar and Marina Bay. The Downtown Core is one of the eleven planning areas within the highly urbanised Central Area and forms the core of Singapore's central city zone. It is bounded by Rochor to the north, Kallang to the northeast, Marina East and Marina South to the east, Straits View to the southeast, Bukit Merah to the south, as well as Outram, Museum and Singapore River to the west.

As the financial heart of Singapore, the Downtown Core houses the headquarters and offices of numerous corporations, as well as the Singapore Exchange. The area is also home to many governmental institutions, notably the seat of Parliament and the Supreme Court of Singapore. Singapore's modern history began in this area, when Stamford Raffles and representatives of the British East India Company landed along the banks of the Singapore River to set up a free port in Southeast Asia. As the old harbour grew along the mouth of the river bank, the city naturally expanded around it, creating what is now the Central Area.

The term "Downtown Core" is rarely used in everyday speech despite being the official planning designation. Instead, the area is commonly referred to as the CBD, Central, the City Area or informally as the City, terms interchangeable with the Central Area as a whole. In practice, the CBD denotes an even smaller portion of the Downtown Core, covering its south western and western sections and comprising eight subzones; Anson, Cecil, Clifford Pier, Maxwell, Phillip, Raffles Place, Tanjong Pagar and Marina Centre, where high rise commercial developments are most concentrated.

== History ==
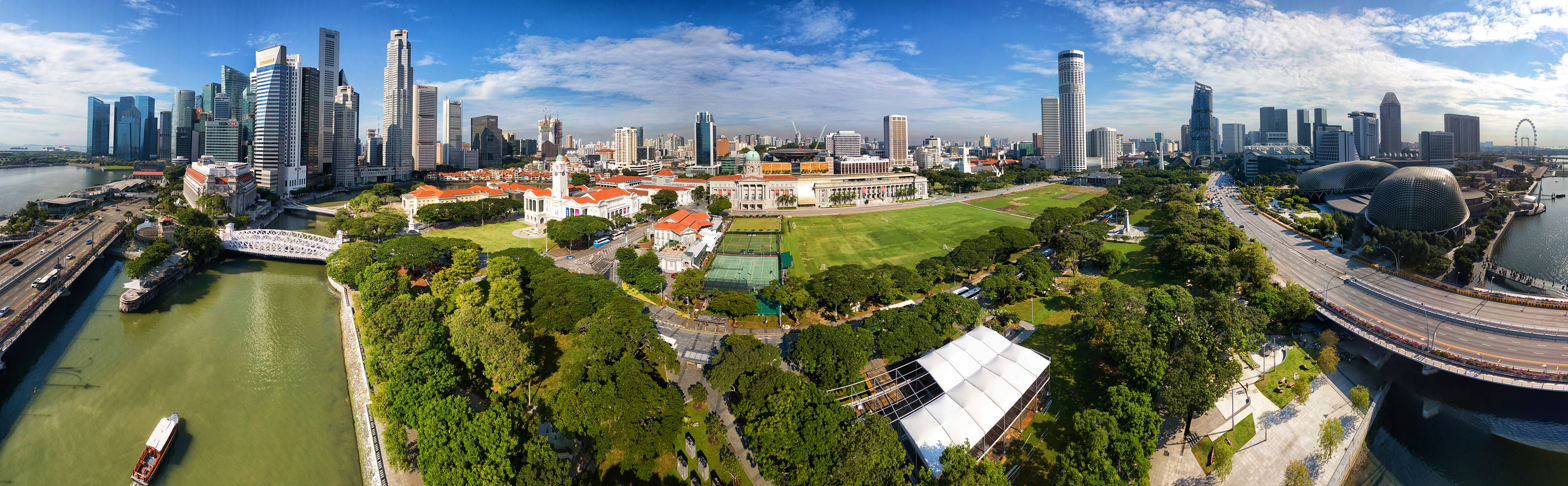
Aerial panorama of Singapore's Downtown Core

As a fledgling colony, the area which is now known as the Downtown Core was the financial, administrative and commercial centre of the colony. In 1823, Singapore was reorganised according to the Raffles Plan of Singapore by Sir Stamford Raffles, which specified elements like the Commercial Square (now Raffles Place) and the European Town as well as various other commercial and administrative entities located between them. This area later became the Downtown Core.
