= Road names in Singapore =

Road names in Singapore come under the purview of the Street and Building Names Board of the Urban Redevelopment Authority. In 1967, the Advisory Committee on the Naming of Roads and Streets was formed to name roads in Singapore. The committee was eventually renamed the Street and Building Names Board (SBNB) in 2003. The secretariat role of SBNB was taken over by Urban Redevelopment Authority in 2010 and SBNB is under the Ministry of National Development of Singapore.

Road names are either in the English language or Malay language, even though many names could be derived from other languages such as Chinese (The main Chinese languages in Singapore are Mandarin, Hokkien, Teochew) and Tamil due to the diverse cultures of the Singaporean society. All road names are also officially translated into Mandarin Chinese by the Ministry of Communications and Information (MCI), although these translations are rarely displayed on road signs.

It is common for a long stretch of road to have different names at different sections; such changes in names usually, but not necessarily, occur at major junctions, or when the road passes over a river or canal. It is also possible for roads that are not directly connected to bear the same name; such cases usually arise from urban redevelopment which divides these initially connected roads into two or more unlinked sections.

Road names in Singapore usually, but not always, have a generic element and a specific element, the former of which could assume two forms: noun (e.g. "Taman", "Hill") or adjective (e.g. "Lengkok", "Rise").

== History ==
=== Under colonial rule ===
In colonial Singapore, road naming was conducted by the Municipal Commission the road naming process. Official road names tended to follow several trends, with the majority of roads named after figures in the colony, either for commemorative purposes, or after the owners of the land or estates the roads were first laid out on. Many roads were also named after places in Malaya and Southeast Asia, to reflect Singapore's status as capital of the Straits Settlements and Malay States, while a small proportion of roads were named after landmarks or economic activities. In addition, roads in proximity to one another often received names that were similar or followed a common trend.

Roads in areas associated with specific ethnic groups also tended to receive names related to these ethnicities. This was initially done to demarcate the ethnic zones within the town area, but continued even after the racial makeup of the districts no longer reflected their specified ethnicity. Road naming trends also differed between Asian and European areas, with roads in European areas given names derived from places in England or which indicated the ideals of European colonists.

Besides the official names given by the colonial authorities, the Asian communities also had their own informal names for roads, which differed between ethnicities and dialect groups. These informal names mostly derived from landmarks along the roads, while others denoted the presence of certain economic activities or secret societies, and some were derived from descriptions of the roads or the area around the roads. The informal names were also imprecise, and differed from the official names in most cases.

=== Singapore post independence ===
After Singapore's independence in 1965, the government adopted new road-naming policies as part of its nation-building effort. A Street Naming Advisory Committee was appointed in February 1967 by the Minister of Finance, and priority was given to local names and Malay names, while names of prominent figures and British places and people were discouraged. Consequently, all roads in newly built residential areas were given Malay names, with Malay generic elements like "Jalan" and "Lorong" frequently used. Opposition from property developers and residents in residential areas, and a lack of available Malay terms for naming new streets put paid to the policy, which was amended in 1968 to discourage the use of Malay in favour of names that reflected Singapore’s multi-ethnic society. In addition, a proposal to use numerical naming was taken up in the late 1960s. This proposal was vetoed by the Finance Minister, but numerical naming was subsequently used in public housing estates in Singapore from the 1960s to the 1990s.

Besides the adoption of new road-naming policies, the Singapore government also set about making official road names, which had hitherto only been provided in the Latin script, more accessible to the non-English speaking Chinese population. To that end, a Committee on the Standardisation of Street Names in Chinese was formed to provide official Chinese translations for the names of all roads in Singapore between 1967 and 1970. Subsequently, in the 1980s, the government attempted to change all Chinese place and road names to follow the Hanyu Pinyin system. This aroused debate and opposition within the government and among the general public, with concerns raised over the historical significance of dialect names and the ease of understanding of Pinyin names. As a result, the government halted efforts to change names to Pinyin in 1987.

== Types of road names ==
Roads names in Singapore typically fall under six categories:

- road names with a prefix (generic element) followed by a specific element;
- road names with a specific element followed by a suffix (generic element);
- road names that include acronyms;
- road names that consist only of a single word;
- road names with the definite article "the" followed by a specific element; and
- road names without any prefix or suffix (generic element).

Due to the differences in the grammatical structure, prefixes could either be in English or Malay, while suffixes are generally in English.

=== Malay-derived generic elements ===
Road names in Singapore do not utilise many Malay generic elements commonly found in neighbouring Malaysia, such as Lebuh ("street"), Tingkat ("terrace"), Cangkat ("rise"), Lebuhraya ("avenue", "highway" or "expressway"), etc. The generic element "Persiaran" ("drive") was used in the road "Persiaran Keliling" in Singapore, but this road has been renamed to "Circuit Road".

| Generic element | Abbreviation used in road signs | Pronunciation in Singapore English | Definition in English | Transliteration in Chinese | Translation/transliteration in Tamil | Example(s) | Remark(s) |
|---|---|---|---|---|---|---|---|
| Bukit | Bt | /ˈbʊkɪt, -eɪt/ | Hill | 武吉 | புக்கிட் | Bukit Ayer Molek, Bukit Purmei | While "Bukit" is used as a generic element, it is also used as part of a specific element such as in the case of Bukit Batok Road. |
| Jalan | Jln | /ˈdʒɑːlɑːn/ | Road | 惹兰 | ஜலான் | Jalan Besar, Jalan Jurong Kechil | |
| Kampong | Kg | /ˈkɑːmpɒŋ/ | Village | 甘榜 | கம்போங் | Kampong Bugis, Kampong Sireh | While "Kampong" is used as a generic element, it is also used as part of a specific element such as in the case of Kampong Java Road. "Kampong" is an archaic variant of the Malay word "kampung". |
| Lengkok | | /ˈləŋkɒʔ, -k/ | Arc, crescent | 麟谷 | | Lengkok Angsa, Lengkok Merak | While "Lengkok" is used as a generic element, it is also used as part of a specific element such as in the case of Jalan Lengkok Sembawang. |
| Lengkong | | /ˈləŋkɒŋ/ | Arc, crescent | 麟光 | | Lengkong Dua, Lengkong Lima | "Lengkong" is an archaic variant of "Lengkok". |
| Lorong | Lor | /ˈlɒrɒŋ/ | Alley, lane | Either 罗弄 or 巷 | | Lorong 1 Toa Payoh, Lorong Chuan, Lorong Halus | While "Lorong" translates to "alley" or "lane" in English, some roads that bear this prefix are actually major roads, such as in the case of Lorong Chuan. |
| Padang | | /ˈpɑːdɑːŋ/ | Field | 马东 | | Padang Chancery, Padang Jeringau | |
| Taman | | /ˈtɑːmɑːn/ | Garden | 达曼 | தாமான் | Taman Ho Swee, Taman Warna | While "Taman" is used as a generic element, it is also used as part of a specific element such as in the case of Jalan Taman. |
| Tanjong | Tg | /ˈtɑːndʒɒŋ/ | Cape | 丹戎 | தஞ்சோங் | Tanjong Penjuru | While "Tanjong" is used as a generic element, it is also used as part of a specific element such as in the case of Tanjong Katong Road. "Tanjong" as a generic element is used only once, and is an archaic variant of the Malay word "tanjung". |
| Telok | | /ˈtəloʊʔ, -k/ | Bay | 直落 | தேலோக் | Telok Kurau, Telok Ayer | |

=== English-derived generic elements ===
| Generic element | Abbreviation used in road signs | Translation in Chinese | Example(s) | Usage structure | Remark(s) | Translation/transliteration in Tamil |
|---|---|---|---|---|---|---|
| Alley | | 小巷 | Sembawang Alley | Suffix | "Alley" as a generic element is used only once. | |
| Avenue | Ave | Either 道 or 大道 | Bedok North Avenue 1, Laurel Wood Avenue | Suffix | | அவென்யூ |
| Bank | | 坂 | Pearl Bank, Siglap Bank | Suffix | While "Bank" is used as a generic element, it is also used a part of as specific element such as in the case of Irwell Bank Road. | |
| Boulevard | Blvd | 林荫道 | Raffles Boulevard, Stadium Boulevard | Suffix | | |
| Bow | | 虹 | Compassvale Bow | Suffix | "Bow" as a generic element is used only once. | |
| Business Park | | 商业园 | International Business Park | Suffix | While "Business Park" is used as a generic element, it is also used as part of a specific element such as in the case of Changi Business Park Crescent. "Business Park" as a generic element is used only once. | |
| Central | Ctrl | 中路 | Bukit Merah Central, Jurong West Central 1 | Suffix | While "Central" is used as a generic element, it is also used as part of a specific element such as in the case of Serangoon Central Drive. "Central" may also be used to differentiate a certain road from another similarly named road, such as in the case of Happy Avenue Central which is distinct from Happy Avenue West. | |
| Circle | | 圈 | Joo Koon Circle, Sunbird Circle | Suffix | Some roads that bear this suffix are in fact not a full circle, such as in the case of Wellington Circle. | |
| Circuit | | 环 | Tuas View Circuit | Suffix | While "Circuit" is used as a generic element, it is also used as part of a specific element such as in the case of Circuit Road. "Circuit" as a generic element is used only once. | |
| Circus | | 圈 | Newton Circus, Pioneer Circus | Suffix | While "Circus" is generally applied to roundabouts, some roads that bear this suffix are not, such as in the case of Nepal Circus. | |
| Close | Cl | 弄 | Anchorvale Close, Seletar Close | Suffix | While "Close" is generally applied to cul-de-sacs, some roads that bear this suffix are in fact not dead end streets, such as in the case of Woodsville Close. | |
| Concourse | | 广场 | Tampines Concourse | Suffix | "Concourse" as a generic element is used only once. | |
| Connect | | 连路 | Hillview Connect | Suffix | | |
| Court | | 阁 | Seletar Court | Suffix | "Court" as a generic element is used only once. | |
| Crescent | Cres | 弯 | Dakota Crescent, Marine Crescent, Plantation Crescent | Suffix | While "Crescent" is used as a generic element, it is also used as part of a specific element such as in the case of Crescent Road. | கிரேசெண்ட் |
| Cross | | 十字路 | Rhu Cross | Suffix | While "Cross" may suggest a road that intersects with itself or another road, Rhu Cross is in fact straight. "Cross" as a generic element is used only once. | |
| Crossing | | 平交道 | Woodlands Crossing | Suffix | "Crossing" as a generic element is used only once. | |
| Drive | Dr | 通道 | Choa Chu Kang Drive, Woodlands Drive 60, Tengah Drive | Suffix | | டிரைவ் |
| East | | Either 东 or 东路 | Punggol East, Toa Payoh East | Suffix | While "East" is used as a generic element, it is also used as part of a specific element such as in the case of Jurong East Street 11. "East" may also be used to differentiate a certain road from another similarly named road, such as in the case of Sims Avenue East which is distinct from Sims Avenue. | |
| Estate | | Either 园 or 村 | Mandai Estate, Swiss Cottage Estate | Suffix | While "Estate" is used as a generic element, it is also used as part of a specific element such as in the case of Sommerville Estate Road. | |
| Expressway | E'way | 快速公路 | Kallang-Paya Lebar Expressway, Pan Island Expressway, Seletar Expressway | Suffix | "Expressway" as a generic element is used exclusively on controlled-access highways. | |
| Farmway | | 农道 | Murai Farmway, Pasir Ris Farmway 1 | Suffix | Farmway historically used for rural roads that served farms, most demolished to make way for urban developments, e.g., Seletar East Farmway | |
| Field | | 场 | Punggol Field | Suffix | While "Field" is used as a generic element, it is also used as part of a specific element such as in the case of Punggol Field Walk. "Field" as a generic element is used only once. | |
| Garden or Gardens | | 花园 | Eng Kong Garden, Pandan Gardens | Suffix | While "Garden" or "Gardens" are used as generic elements, they are also used as part of a specific element such as in the cases of Island Gardens Walk and Serangoon Garden Way. | |
| Gate | | 门 | Hyde Park Gate, Sultan Gate | Suffix | While "Gate" is used as a generic element, it is also used as part of a specific element such as in the case of Dalvey Gate Road. | |
| Gateway | | 通路 | one-north Gateway, Sentosa Gateway | Suffix | While "Gateway" is used as a generic element, it is also used as part of a specific element such as in the case of Jurong Gateway Road. | |
| Grande | | 大街 | Tampines Grande | Suffix | "Grande" as a generic element is used only once. | |
| Green | | 埔 | Buangkok Green, River Valley Green | Suffix | While "Green" is used as a generic element, it is also used as part of a specific element such as in the case of Seletar Green Avenue. | |
| Grove | | 林 | Faber Grove, Tukang Innovation Grove | Suffix | While "Grove" is used as a generic element, it is also used as part of a specific element such as in the case of Palm Grove Avenue. | |
| Height or Heights | | 岭 | Springleaf Height, Telok Blangah Heights, Lucky Heights | Suffix | While "Height" or "Heights are generally applied to roads that are situated on high grounds, some roads that bear this suffix are located on flat terrains, such as in the case of Woodlands Height. | |
| Highway | Hway | Either 大道 or 大路 | Nicoll Highway, West Coast Highway | Suffix | "Highway" as a generic element is used exclusively on semi-expressways. | |
| Hill | | 山 | Ann Siang Hill, Paterson Hill | Suffix | While "Hill" is used as a generic element, it is also used as part of a specific element such as in the case of Chancery Hill Road. While "Hill" is generally applied to roads that are situated on high grounds, some roads that bear this suffix are located on flat terrains, such as in the case of Claymore Hill. | |
| Industrial Park | Ind Park | Either 工业园 or 工业区 | Ang Mo Kio Industrial Park 1, Toa Payoh Industrial Park, Woodlands Industrial Park E1 | Suffix | While "Industrial Park" is used as a generic element, it is also used as part of a specific element such as in the case of Woodlands Industrial Park D Street 1. | |
| Island | | 岛 | Coral Island, Sandy Island | Suffix | While "Island" is used as a generic element, it is also used as part of a specific element such as in the case of Jurong Island Highway. | |
| Junction | | 交叉路 | Bedok Junction, Kallang Junction | Suffix | | |
| Lane | | 巷 | Chai Chee Lane, Lim Chu Kang Lane 1 | Suffix | | |
| Link | | 连路 | Buangkok Link, Tuas Link 1 | Suffix | While "Link" is generally applied to roads that serve as a connection to two or more roads, some roads that bear this suffix are dead end streets, such as in the case of Bukit Panjang Link. | |
| Loop | | Either 环道 or 环路 | Kranji Loop, Senoko Loop | Suffix | Some roads that bear this suffix are in fact not a full loop, such as in the case of Choa Chu Kang Loop. | |
| Mall | | Either 广场, 行人广场 or 林荫路 | Cuppage Mall, Marina Mall | Suffix | | |
| Mount | Mt | 山 | Mount Elizabeth, Mount Sophia | Prefix | While "Mount" is used as a generic element, it is also used as part of a specific element such as in the case of Mount Pleasant Road. | |
| North | | Either 北 or 北路 | Choa Chu Kang North 5, Toa Payoh North | Suffix | While "North" is used as a generic element, it is also used as part of a specific element such as in the case of North Coast Drive. "North" may also be used to differentiate a certain road from another similarly named road, such as in the case of Clemenceau Avenue North which is distinct from Clemenceau Avenue. | |
| Park | | 园 | Draycott Park, Ming Teck Park | Suffix | While "Park" is used as a generic element, it is also used as part of a specific element such as in the case of Farrer Park Road. | |
| Parkway | | 公园大道 | East Coast Parkway | Suffix | "Parkway" as a generic element is used only once, and reserved exclusively for controlled-access highways. | |
| Path | | 小径 | Chinese Cemetery Path 1, Muslim Cemetery Path 1 | Suffix | | |
| Place | Pl | 坊 | Boon Lay Place, Sims Place | Suffix | While "Place" is generally applied to cul-de-sacs, some roads that bear this suffix are in fact not dead end streets, such as in the case of Kallang Place. | |
| Plain or Plains | | 坪 | Edgedale Plains, Lentor Plain | Suffix | | |
| Plaza | | 广场 | Goldhill Plaza, Tanjong Pagar Plaza | Suffix | | |
| Promenade | | 宝龙坊 | Kim Seng Promenade | Suffix | "Promenade" as a generic element is used only once. | |
| Quay | | 码头 | Collyer Quay, North Boat Quay | Suffix | | |
| Ridge | | 岗 | Tanah Merah Kechil Ridge, Thomson Ridge | Suffix | While "Ridge" is used as a generic element, it is also used as part of a specific element such as in the case of Lower Kent Ridge Road. | |
| Ring | | 环路 | Stagmont Ring | Suffix | "Ring" as a generic element is used only once for Stagmont Ring. While merely a straight road today, the road used to be more ring-like in the past. | |
| Ring Road | Ring Rd | 环路 | Woodlands Ring Road, Yishun Ring Road, Bukit Panjang Ring Road | Suffix | Some roads that bear this suffix are in fact not a complete ring, such as in the case of Bukit Panjang Ring Road. | |
| Rise | | 坡 | Changi North Rise, Simei Rise | Suffix | While "Rise" may suggest a road that is situated on a slope, some roads that bear this suffix are located on flat terrains, such as in the case of Soo Chow Rise. | |
| Road | Rd | 路 | Thomson Road, Upper Jurong Road | Suffix | Most common generic element in Singapore | சாலை, ரோட்டை, ரோடு |
| Sector | | 段 | Kallang Sector, Pioneer Sector 1, Sector A Sin Ming Industrial Estate | Prefix and suffix | While "Sector" is used as a generic element, it is also used as part of a specific element such as in the case of Pioneer Sector Lane. | |
| Service Road | Service Rd | 副路 | East Coast Park Service Road, Yishun Central Service Road | Suffix | While "Service Road" generally refers to roads that run parallel to a highway, some roads that bear this suffix do not follow this rule, such as in the case of Yishun Central Service Road. | |
| South | | 南路 | Whampoa South | Suffix | While "South" is used as a generic element, it is also used as part of a specific element such as in the case of Tuas South Avenue 1. "South" as a generic element is used only once. "South" may also be used to differentiate a certain road from another similarly named road, such as in the case of Still Road South which is distinct from Still Road. | |
| Square | Sq | 广场 | Ellington Square, Sengkang Square | Suffix | While "Square" generally refers to roads that resemble a square in shape, some roads that bear this suffix do not follow this rule, such as in the case of Flanders Square. | |
| Street | St | 街 | Bishan Street 11, Victoria Street | Suffix | The abbreviation for "Street", "St", is also frequently used to represent "Saint" in road signs. | ஸ்திரீட் |
| Terrace | | 台 | Joo Chiat Terrace, Pearl's Hill Terrace | Suffix | | |
| Track | | 乡道 | Mandai Lake Road - Track 9, Turut Track | Suffix | | |
| Turn | | Either 弯 or 弯路 | Engku Aman Turn, Orchard Turn | Suffix | While "Turn" may suggest a winding road, some roads that bear this suffix are straight, such as in the case of Pioneer Turn. | |
| Underpass | | 地下通道 | Tuas West Underpass, T4 Underpass | Suffix | | |
| Vale | | 谷 | Clifton Vale, Sunset Vale | Suffix | | |
| Valley | | 谷 | Nanyang Valley, Pandan Valley | Suffix | While "Valley" is used as a generic element, it is also used as part of a specific element such as in the case of River Valley Road. | |
| Viaduct | | 高架橋 | Keppel Viaduct | Suffix | | |
| View | | 景 | Tanjong Rhu View, Ubi View | Suffix | While "View" is used as a generic element, it is also used as part of a specific element such as in the case of Tuas View Square. | |
| Vista | | Either 景 or 风景路 | Changi Business Park Vista, Keppel Bay Vista | Suffix | While "Vista" is used as a generic element, it is also used as part of a specific element such as in the case of North Buona Vista Road. | |
| Walk | | 径 | Compassvale Walk, Paya Lebar Walk | Suffix | | |
| Way | | Either 大道 or 道 | Canberra Way, Shenton Way | Suffix | | |
| West | | 西路 | Toa Payoh West, Whampoa West | Suffix | While "West" is used as a generic element, it is also used as part of a specific element such as in the case of West Camp Road. "West" may also be used to differentiate a certain road from another similarly named road, such as in the case of Commonwealth Avenue West which is distinct from Commonwealth Avenue. | |
| Wood | | 林 | Saint Anne's Wood | Suffix | While "Wood" is used as a generic element, it is also used as part of a specific element such as in the case of Laurel Wood Avenue. "Wood" as a generic element is used only once. | |

=== Road names that include acronyms ===
There are several instances whereby the official road names include acronyms.

Examples include:

| Road name | Full form of acronym |
|---|---|
| Alps Avenue | "ALPS" is the acronym for the Airport Logistics Park of Singapore |
| T1 Departure Crescent | "T1" refers to Terminal 1 of Changi Airport |
| T4 Way | "T4" refers to Terminal 4 of Changi Airport |

=== Road names that consist only of a single word ===
Road names in this category are extremely rare in Singapore. There are currently only four roads that bear single-word names:

- Bishopsgate
- Causeway
- Piccadilly
- Queensway

=== Road names with the definite article "the" ===
Road names in this category are extremely rare in Singapore. There are currently only three road names that include "the":

- The Inglewood
- The Knolls
- The Oval

=== Road names without any generic element ===
There are currently only five road names that do not have any generic element:

| Road name | Elaboration |
|---|---|
| Geylang Bahru | "Geylang" is a location (specific element) which is derived from the malay word "kilang", meaning "factory", while "Bahru" is an archaic variant of "baru", meaning "new" in English. |
| Geylang Serai | "Geylang" is a location (specific element) which is derived from the malay word "kilang",, meaning "factory", while "Serai" translates to "lemongrass" in English. |
| Kallang Bahru | "Kallang" is a location (specific element), while "Bahru" is an archaic variant of "baru", meaning "new" in English. |
| Kallang Tengah | "Kallang" is a location (specific element), while "Tengah" translates to "central" in English. |
| Wholesale Centre | This road is named after the Pasir Panjang Wholesale Centre that it is located in. |

== Naming convention ==
=== Expressways ===
Expressways of Singapore are given official abbreviations for ease of identification. Abbreviations consist of three letters; the first two letters correspond to the first two syllables of the name, while the last letter is derived from the first letter of the last word.

The only exceptions to this rule are Kallang-Paya Lebar Expressway (KPE) and Marina Coastal Expressway (MCE). "KPE" allows for both locations, Kallang and Paya Lebar, to be represented. "MCE" is selected to highlight the expressway's close proximity to the coast.

Names of expressways always appear in their abbreviated forms on road signs.

=== Road names in residential towns ===
Unlike other cities, it is very common for Singaporean roads to have derivative names (i.e. roads sharing the same specific element while differing only in their generic element). Many locations in Singapore, especially residential towns, follow this naming format. Certain generic elements are used only for a specific purpose, such as "Central" which is often reserved for roads that are located within town centres.

Road names in mature residential towns and estates (for example, Ang Mo Kio and Tampines) generally follow a numerical scheme. Those that do not are mostly non-mature towns (for example, Sengkang and Punggol) and locations where residential precincts are not concentrated or clustered (for example, Kallang and Marine Parade).

| Generic element | Elaboration |
|---|---|
| Avenue (Ave) | Generally used for major roads within a town. "Avenues" in a mature town are usually numbered (e.g. Ang Mo Kio Avenue 1), while those in a non-mature estate are not (e.g. Sengkang West Avenue). |
| Central | Generally used for roads within town centres, with the notable exceptions of Sungei Kadut Central and Lentor Central which are located in an industrial estate and in a private residential estate respectively. |
| Drive (Dr) | Generally used for secondary roads that connect the various neighbourhoods within a town. "Drives" in a mature town are usually numbered (e.g. Woodlands Drive 14), while those in a non-mature estate are not (e.g. Punggol Drive). A notable exception is Pasir Ris, where "drives" function more like the "avenues" of other Singaporean towns. |
| Road (Rd) | Generally used for major roads that link a particular town with surrounding towns or estates. For example, Woodlands Road connects Woodlands with Choa Chu Kang and Bukit Panjang. |
| Street (St) | Generally used for secondary roads that connect the various neighbourhoods within a town. "Streets" in a mature town are usually numbered (e.g. Tampines Street 71), while those in a non-mature estate are not (e.g. Anchorvale Street). |

=== Generic elements reserved for specific roads ===
While suffixes like "Drive" and "Street" may be used interchangeably in most cases, some generic terms tend to only be used on roads that fulfil a certain criteria.

| Generic element | Elaboration | Example(s) | Notable exception(s) | |
|---|---|---|---|---|
| Boulevard (Blvd) | Mostly used for roads in the Central Area or roads that are in close proximity to a landmark. | Airport Boulevard and Stadium Boulevard are located near important landmarks (Singapore Changi Airport and the National Stadium respectively), while Marina Boulevard and Raffles Boulevard are located in the Central Area. | Tuas South Boulevard is located in an industrial estate. | பொலிவார்ட் |
| Business Park | Used for roads located within an office park. | International Business Park is located within its namesake. | | |
| Central | Mostly used for roads within a town centre. | Marine Parade Central and Tampines Central 1 are roads that serve the respective town centres of Marine Parade and Tampines. | Sungei Kadut Central is located within the Sungei Kadut industrial estate, and Lentor Central is located within the Lentor private residential community. | |
| Expressway (E'way) | Used only for controlled-access highways. | Bukit Timah Expressway and Seletar Expressway are part of the Singapore expressway network. | | |
| Farmway | Used for roads in rural areas. | Murai Farmway and Seletar West Farmway 1 are located in the rural outskirts of Singapore. | | |
| Gateway | Used for roads that serve as an entry point to a significant location or landmark. | one-north Gateway and Sentosa Gateway lead to one-north and Sentosa respectively. | | |
| Highway (Hway) | Used only for semi-expressways. | Nicoll Highway and West Coast Highway are considered "semi-expressways". | | |
| Industrial Park (Ind Park) | Used for roads within an industrial estate. | Bedok Industrial Park C and Pasir Ris Coast Industrial Park 1 are roads within industrial zones. | | |
| Island | Used for roads that link to an offshore island. | Paradise Island and Sandy Island lead to their namesake islands in Sentosa Cove. | | |
| Parkway | Used only for controlled-access highways. | East Coast Parkway is part of the Singapore expressway network. | | |
| Plaza | Used for roads that are near commercial development. | Goldhill Plaza and Tanjong Pagar Plaza are surrounded by commercial buildings. | | |
| Promenade | Used for roads along a river or by the sea. | Kim Seng Promenade is located beside the Singapore River. | | |
| Quay | Used for roads along a river or by the sea. | Collyer Quay and Raffles Quay are in close proximity to the Marina Bay. | | |
| Service Road (Service Rd) | Used for roads that run parallel to a highway or major road. | East Coast Park Service Road runs almost parallel to East Coast Parkway. | Yishun Central Service Road is a minor road located within Yishun, and it does not run parallel to a major road. | |
| Sector | Used for roads in within an industrial estate. | Benoi Sector and Kallang Sector are roads within industrial zones. | | |
| Track | Used for roads in rural areas. | Choa Chu Kang Road - Track 14 and Mandai Lake Road - Track 9 are located in the rural outskirts of Singapore. | | |

=== Road name modifiers ===
In certain scenarios whereby two or more roads are similarly named, modifiers are used to differentiate between these roads for easier identification. One reason for the existence of these similarly-named roads is urban redevelopment which turned previously singular roads into distinct, unconnected sections, effectively turning them into different roads altogether.

The following are modifiers used in Singapore road names to differentiate between similarly-named roads:

| Modifier | Abbreviation used in road signs | Translation in Chinese | Example | Similarly-named counterpart(s) |
|---|---|---|---|---|
| Central | | 中 | Happy Avenue Central | Happy Avenue East, Happy Avenue North, Happy Avenue West |
| East | | 东 | Bartley Road East | Bartley Road |
| Lower | | 下段 | Lower Delta Road | Delta Road |
| New | | 新 | New Upper Changi Road | Upper Changi Road |
| North | | 北 | Sturdee Road North | Sturdee Road |
| Old | | 旧 | Old Choa Chu Kang Road | Choa Chu Kang Road |
| South | | 南 | Tanjong Katong Road South, Still Road South | Tanjong Katong Road, Still Road |
| Upper | Upp | 上段 | Upper Bukit Timah Road, Upper East Coast Road | Bukit Timah Road, East Coast Road |
| West | | 西 | Admiralty Road West | Admiralty Road |

=== Common Malay terms in road names ===
The following are common Malay-derived terms found in Singapore road names (excluding those listed as "generic elements" above):

| Malay term | Definition in English | Transliteration in Chinese | Example(s) |
|---|---|---|---|
| Bahru | New | 峇鲁 | Kallang Bahru, Kampong Bahru Road |
| Barat | West | 巴叻 | Jalan Kilang Barat, Jalan Novena Barat |
| Lembah | Valley | 仑巴 | Jalan Lembah Bedok, Jalan Lembah Kallang |
| Merah | Red | 美拉 | Jalan Ikan Merah, Taman Mas Merah |
| Pasir | Sand | 巴西 | Jalan Pasir Ria, Pasir Ris Drive 1 |
| Selatan | South | 实拉丹 | Jalan Novena Selatan |
| Telok | Bay | 直落 | Lorong J Telok Kurau, Telok Blangah Heights |
| Timor | East | 蒂摩 | Jalan Kilang Timor, Jalan Novena Timor |
| Ulu | Origin, rural, upstream | 乌鲁 | Jalan Ulu Seletar, Ulu Pandan Road |
| Utara | North | 乌打拉 | Jalan Novena Utara |
