= North–south highway =

North–South Highway may refer to road:

- North–South Highway (Armenia) in Armenia
- North–South Expressway (Malaysia) in Malaysia
- North–South Expressway, Singapore in Singapore
- North–South Highway (Prague) in Prague, Czech Republic
