= Speed limits in Singapore =

Generally, the speed limits in Singapore are 50 km/h unless stated otherwise. The speed limit is restricted to 40 km/h in School Zones, and 40 km/h or 30 km/h in Silver Zones. Most expressways have speed limits of either 80 km/h or 90 km/h. Offenders who are caught speeding will be fined and/or jailed.
