= Seletar Expressway =

Highway in Singapore

Coordinates: 1.3965°N 103.8146°E

Seletar Expressway
- Lebuhraya Seletar (Malay) 实里达高速公路 (Chinese) செலேத்தார் விரைவுச்சாலை (Tamil)

Route information
- Length: 11 km (6.8 mi)
- History: Completed in 1998

Major junctions
- West end: Kranji (BKE)
- BKE, NSC, CTE, TPE
- East end: Seletar (CTE, TPE)

Location
- Country: Singapore
- Regions: Woodlands, Mandai, Kranji, Seletar, Yio Chu Kang, Yishun, Sengkang (West)

Highway system
- Expressways of Singapore

The Seletar Expressway (Abbreviation: SLE) is a highway in Singapore that traverses the northern end of the island and joins the Central Expressway (CTE) and the Tampines Expressway (TPE) in Seletar to the Bukit Timah Expressway (BKE) in Kranji.

== History ==
In the 1980s, the SLE was proposed to link BKE in Kranji to the CTE in Yio Chu Kang. In 1983, it was announced that SLE would only be built after work on the northern expansion of CTE from Toa Payoh to Yio Chu Kang was completed.

The SLE was constructed as a six-lane dual carriageway, remaining as such to this day. The first phase of the construction of SLE consisted of a stretch between Yio Chu Kang and Upper Thomson Road, which included a direct connection with the CTE at Yio Chu Kang Flyover, and was opened on 24 March 1990. By July 1996, the TPE was extended to connect with the SLE at Seletar Flyover.

In the mid-1990s, the SLE was extended from Upper Thomson Road to the BKE. It replaced various roads — Lorong Handalan, Lorong Lentor, Lorong Selangin and Lorong Hablor. The Upper Thomson Road - BKE extension was opened in two parts: from BKE to Woodlands Avenue 2 on 5 November 1995, and from Woodlands Avenue 2 to Upper Thomson Road on 22 February 1998. Construction of the second phase began in 1992. The interchange of SLE and BKE was completed in 1994. The third stage of construction, completing in July 1996 from Woodlands Avenue 2 to Lorong Gambas. The final phase involved the construction from Lorong Gambas to Upper Thomson Road, and involved clearing out Lorong Gambas, Jalan Ulu Sembawang, and some dirt tracks. The last section of this expressway which opened was the last completed expressway project in Singapore until the opening of a section of the Kallang–Paya Lebar Expressway on 28 October 2007.

== List of interchanges and exits ==
Location	km	mi	Flyover	Exit	Destinations	Notes
Ang Mo Kio	0.0	0.0	Yio Chu Kang	—	CTE (towards AYE)	Southern terminus, expressway continues as CTE
Ang Mo Kio	0.4	0.25	—	1	TPE (towards PIE)	Northbound exit and southbound entrance Only
Ang Mo Kio	1	0.62	—	1A	Yio Chu Kang Road	Southbound exit and northbound entrance only
Ang Mo Kio	1.3	0.81	Seletar	1B	TPE (towards PIE)	Southbound exit and northbound entrance only
Yishun	1.3	0.81	Seletar	1C	Seletar West Link; Seletar Aerospace Drive	Southbound exit and northbound entrance only
Yishun	3.3	2.1	Lentor	3	Lentor Avenue	Southbound exit for Lentor Ave. (both bounds); Northbound exit for only Lentor Ave. (northbound); Southbound entrance from only Lentor Ave. (southbound); Northbound entrance from only Lentor Ave. (northbound)
Yishun	5.1	3.2	Upper Thomson	5	Upper Thomson Road	
Yishun	7.9	4.9	Sembawang	8B	Mandai Avenue (Eastbound)	Southbound exit and entrance only
Mandai	8.4	5.2	—	8A	Mandai Road	Northbound exit and entrance only
Mandai	9.3	5.8	Ulu Sembawang	9	Woodlands Avenue 12	
Woodlands	10.4	6.5	Marsiling	10	Woodlands Avenue 2	
Woodlands	11.9	7.4	Woodlands South	11	BKE (towards PIE); Turf Club Avenue	
Sungei Kadut	12.4	7.7	Woodlands South	—	BKE (towards Woodlands)	Western terminus; expressway continue as BKE
1.000 mi = 1.609 km; 1.000 km = 0.621 mi: Incomplete access; Route transition

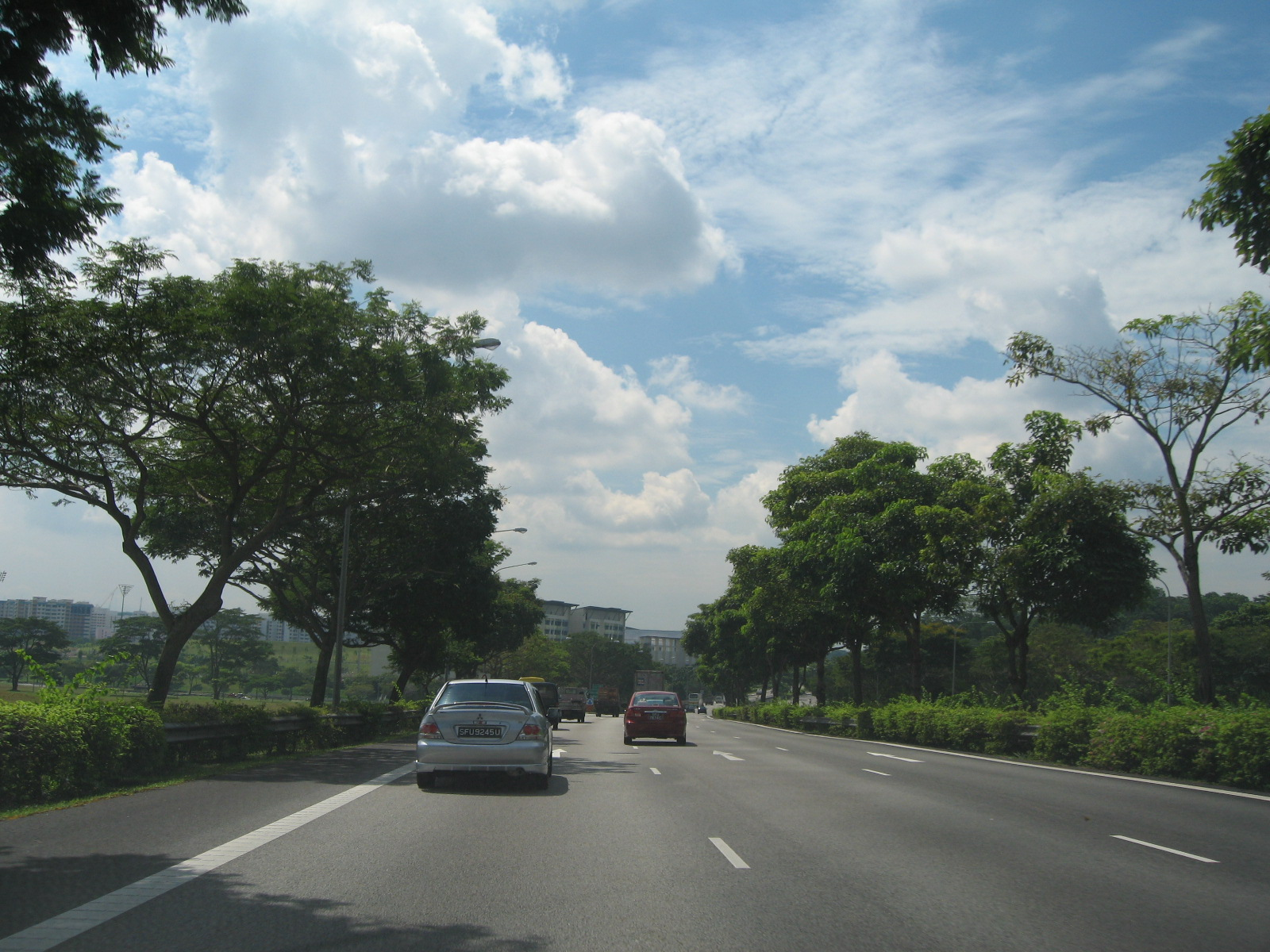
Seletar Expressway eastbound towards Tampines Expressway before Woodlands Avenue 2 exit.
