= Kallang–Paya Lebar Expressway =

Road in Singapore

Kallang–Paya Lebar Expressway
- Lebuhraya Kallang-Paya Lebar (Malay) 加冷－巴耶利峇高速公路 (Chinese) கலாங்-பாயலேபார் விரைவுச்சாலை (Tamil)
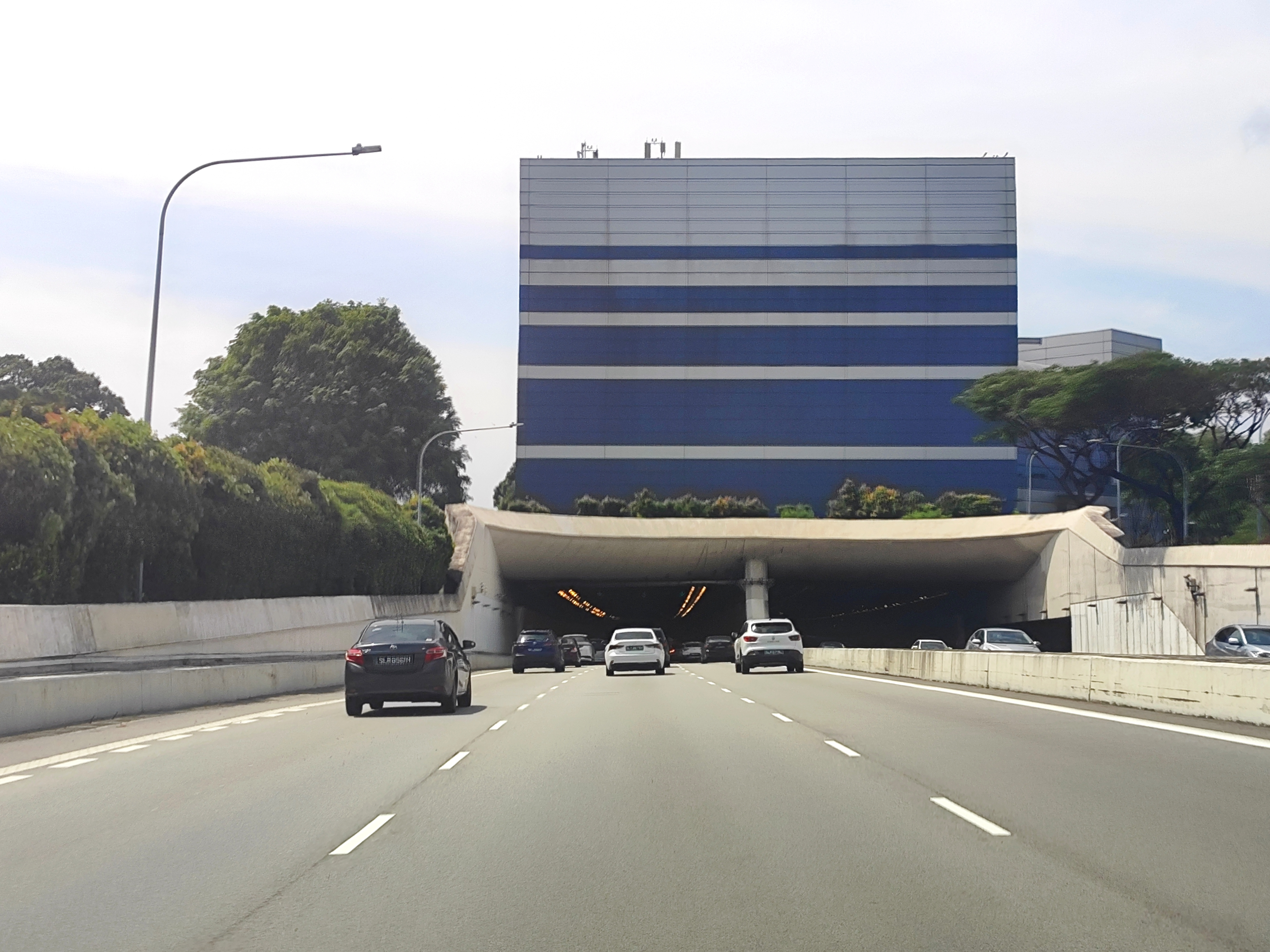

Route information
- Part of AH143
- Length: 12 km (7.5 mi)
- Existed: 2001–present
- History: Completed in 2008

Major junctions
- Southeast end: Kallang (ECP, MCE)
- TPE, ORRS (Bartley Road East), PIE, ECP, MCE
- Northeast end: Hougang (TPE)

Location
- Country: Singapore
- Regions: Hougang, Kallang, Geylang, Paya Lebar

Highway system
- Expressways of Singapore

The Kallang–Paya Lebar Expressway (KPE) is the third newest of Singapore's network of expressways. The southern (Kallang) section of the expressway opened first, on 26 October 2007, with the remaining (Paya Lebar) section opening on 20 September 2008.

Connecting the East Coast Parkway (ECP) in the south to the Tampines Expressway (TPE) in the northeast, this six-lane (2x3) expressway spans over 12 kilometres (7.5 mi), featuring approximately 8.13 kilometres (5.05 mi) of main cut and cover tunnels. Built at a cost of roughly S$1.8 billion (USD1 billion), it stands as the longest subterranean road tunnel in Southeast Asia and was believed to be the world's sixth-longest underground road project during its construction.

In total, the dual-carriageway expressway features three lanes in each direction, supported by eight interchanges, 11 on-ramps and 12 off-ramps. The southern terminus of the KPE connects directly to the Marina Coastal Expressway (MCE), which opened on 29 December 2013. This extension added a further 4.33 kilometres (2.69 mi) of road tunnels, bringing the total continuous underground network to 12.46 kilometres (7.74 mi).

In 2015, the Land Transport Authority (LTA) awarded a contract to expand the KPE/TPE interchange and construct a new road connection to Punggol Central, aimed at alleviating congestion between the KPE and Punggol ramps. The project involved designing and building new roads, a flyover across the TPE, associated ramps and three new vehicular bridges crossing Sungei Serangoon and Sungei Blukar. Construction was executed in phases and fully completed in 2020.

== History ==
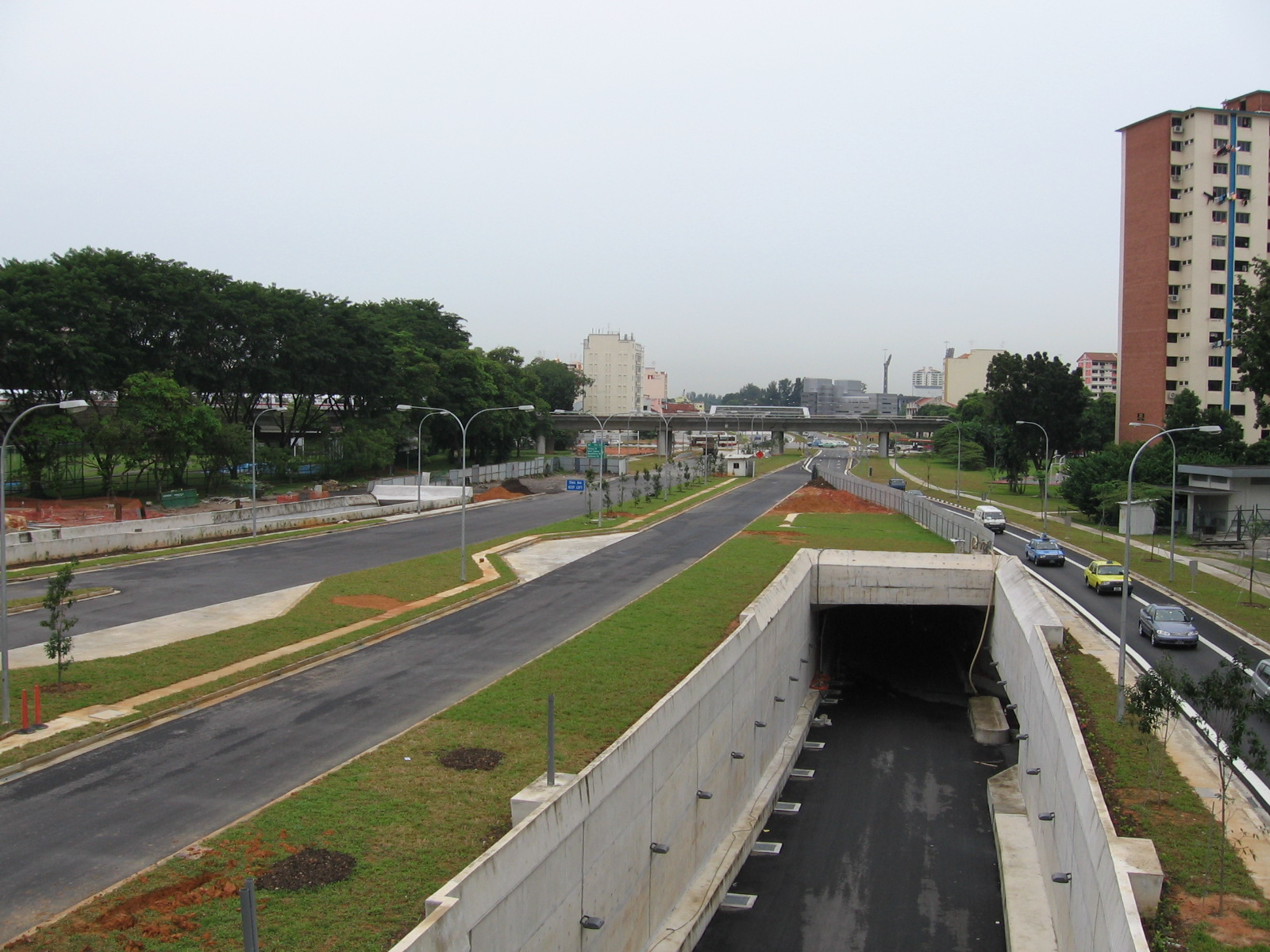
The Kallang-Paya Lebar Expressway under construction in 2005

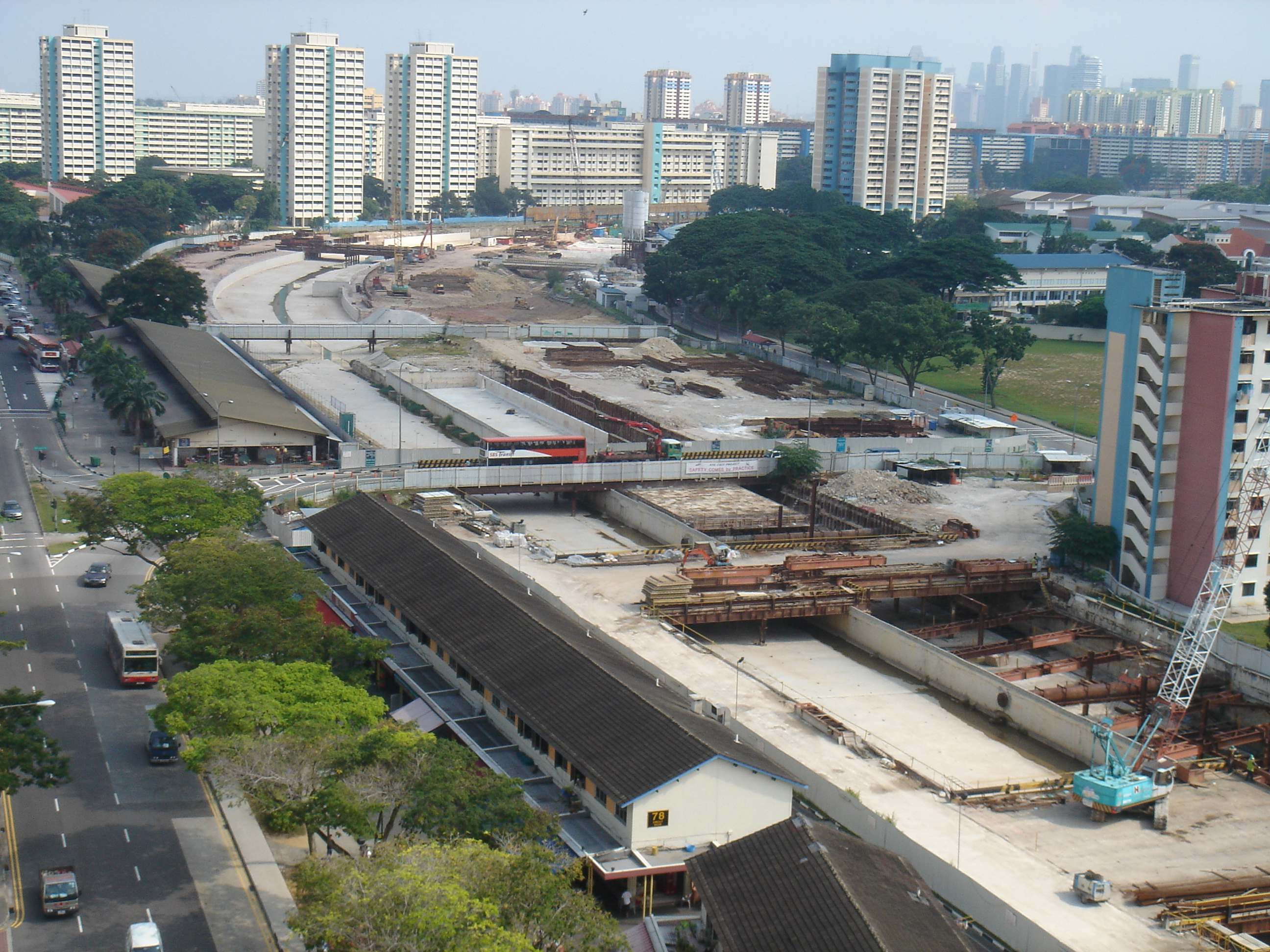
KPE under construction at Circuit Road, MacPherson

A 2.8 km-long Kallang Expressway (KLE) was envisioned as early as 1981, serving as a link between the Pan Island Expressway (PIE) and East Coast Parkway (ECP). It would have become the shortest expressway in Singapore if it was built.

The modern Kallang–Paya Lebar Expressway (KPE) was first conceptualised in the preliminary plans of 1997, merging the KLE and the Paya Lebar Expressway (PLE) into a single expressway.

Construction on KPE started in the year 2001, and was fully completed in 2008. On 23 June 2007, the northern end of the expressway between Tampines Road from the new Defu Flyover and the Tampines Expressway was opened to traffic, and was temporarily named Tampines Service Road. At the same time, Tampines Road was re-routed to no longer connect with the Tampines Expressway at the Tampines Flyover. The Defu Flyover along Tampines Road, along with the traffic signals, were commissioned on the same day from 1000 hours.

On 27 July 2007, the LTA announced the opening of the southern ECP-PIE section of the expressway (Phase 1) to traffic on 26 October that year. The entire expressway opened to traffic on 20 September 2008. An official opening was held on 19 October.

== Route ==
The Kallang section of the expressway starts from eastern end of the Marina Coastal Expressway, where it also interchanges with the East Coast Parkway near the fourteen-kilometre mark of the ECP in a northward direction, goes underground below the Geylang River, cuts across the Kallang Sports Complex to the west of the National Stadium, comes to an interchange at the Mountbatten Road/Nicoll Highway/Guillemard Road junction, crosses the East West MRT line, before ending with an interchange with the Pan Island Expressway at the thirteen-kilometre mark of the latter. It adds along some slip roads and minor roads.

The Paya Lebar section continues from where the Kallang Section leaves off beneath the Kallang River and Pelton Canal past MacPherson Estate, comes to an interchange with Paya Lebar Road, Upper Paya Lebar Road, MacPherson Road and Airport Road, crosses over the Circle MRT line which was under construction at the same time as the expressway, and continues for almost three and a half kilometres underground beneath Airport Road and the Paya Lebar Air Base, emerges at ground level near Defu Lane 3, goes on an elevated interchange over Tampines Road. It meets Buangkok East Drive at an interchange before continuing towards the existing Tampines Flyover to meet with Tampines Expressway. It replaces one of the fish farms at Tampines Road.

On 27 July 2007, the LTA announced an extension of the KPE from East Coast Parkway to the Ayer Rajah Expressway via Marina South. The stretch was named Marina Coastal Expressway (MCE). The Marina Coastal Expressway officially opened on 29 December 2013.

== List of interchanges and exits ==
Location	km	mi	Flyover	Exit	Destinations	Notes
Kallang	0.0	0.0	Start of KPE underground tunnel section			
Kallang	0.0	0.0	—	—	MCE (towards AYE)	Southern terminus; expressway continues as MCE
Kallang	0.4	0.25	—	1	Sheares Avenue (Westbound)	Southbound exit and northbound entrance only
Kallang	0.4	0.25	—	1A	ECP (towards Changi)	Southbound exit and northbound entrance only
Kallang	1.6	0.99	—	2A	Nicoll Highway, Stadium Drive, Stadium Road	Southbound exit and northbound entrance only
Geylang	2.2	1.4	—	2B	PIE (towards Tuas); PIE (towards Changi)	Northbound exit and southbound entrance only
Geylang	2.8	1.7	—	2C	Sims Avenue	Southbound exit and northbound entrance only
Geylang	3.6	2.2	—	3	PIE (towards Tuas)	Southbound exit and northbound entrance only
Hougang	4.9	3.0	—	5	Upper Paya Lebar Road	Northbound exit to Upper Paya Lebar Road (Northbound) and southbound entrance from Airport Road (Westbound) only
Kaki Bukit	6.1	3.8	—	6	Bartley Road East (Eastbound)	Northbound exit only
Kaki Bukit	6.1	3.8	—	6	Bartley Road East (Eastbound), Airport Road	Southbound exit only
Hougang	8.5	5.3	End of KPE underground tunnel section Start of KPE above-ground section			
Hougang	8.8	5.5	Defu	9A	Tampines Road, Hougang Town, Tampines Avenue 10	
Hougang	9.8	6.1	Buangkok	9B	Buangkok Drive (towards Sengkang)	
Paya Lebar	10.9	6.8	Buangkok	10	Buangkok East Drive (towards Tampines Road)	
Pasir Ris	11.1	6.9	Tampines	9C	TPE (towards CTE / SLE); Halus Link, Lorong Halus, Punggol Central	
Pasir Ris	12.0	7.5	Tampines	—	TPE (towards PIE)	Northern terminus; expressway continues as TPE
1.000 mi = 1.609 km; 1.000 km = 0.621 mi: Incomplete access; Route transition

== Public education and congestion management ==
In 2006, the Land Transport Authority (LTA) engaged an advertising agency to embark on a public education programme, to inform and educate the public on the proper way to use the KPE – the first time it has done so for a road project. British firm Bartle Bogle Hegarty (BBH) has been appointed to publicise safety messages needed to prepare users for the KPE. BBH, which in turn appointed British public relations firm Grayling, clinched the contract for S$2.81 million. Its campaign started in the second quarter of 2007, consisting of a website and an album Sounds of the Underground of ten songs for the purpose.

The LTA has also put up a tender calling for consultants to develop congestion management systems in the KPE. The call has drawn three submissions. It also rolled out the first dedicated team of Traffic Marshals, with the primary role of rapid deployment to any incident within the tunnels. The annual contract was awarded to Certis CISCO, who would deploy six marshals on motorcycles around the clock in the KPE, to be expanded to 28 motorcycles and three cars across all expressways by the end of 2008.

== Speed cameras ==
KPE's underground section is fitted with digital speed cameras that operate 24 hours throughout the day to enforce the 80 km/h speed limit (lower if safety advisories display so).

In the first week of phase 1 operation 3,400 motorists were caught speeding in the KPE, consisting of 3% of the total traffic which alarmed the traffic police. 45 of the speed violators which were in excess of 40 km/h received court summons, while others received either a traffic summons or a warning letter from the Land Transport Authority.

The speed cameras are easily spotted in the middle section of the tunnel and are found under the main via ducting. There have been no instances of speed cameras flashes indicating a violating vehicle exceeding the limit, as the luminosity in the tunnel does not require additional light source.
