= Paya Lebar =

Planning Area in Eastern Singapore

- Planning Area

Other transcription(s)
  - Malay: Paya Lebar (Rumi) ڤايا ليبر (Jawi)
  - Chinese: 巴耶利峇; Bāyē Lìbā (Pinyin); Pa-iâ Lī-bā (Hokkien POJ)
  - Tamil: பாய லேபார் Pāya Lēpar (Transliteration)
- Location of Paya Lebar in Singapore

- Location within Singapore
- Coordinates: 1.3533°N 103.8937°E
- Country: Singapore
- Region: East

Government
  - Mayors: ----

Area
  - Total: 11.69 km^{2} (4.51 sq mi)

Population (2026)
  - Total: 20
  - Density: 1.7/km^{2} (4.4/sq mi)

Ethnic groups

Paya Lebar (IPA: /ˈpaɪə ˌleɪbɑːr/ PYE-ə LAY-bar (Note: Alternative pronunciations include: /ˈpɑːjə-/ PAH-yə LAY-bar; /ˈpɑːjɑː-/ PAH-yah LAY-bar)) is a planning area located in the East Region of Singapore, bordered by Hougang to the west, Sengkang to the northwest, Tampines to the east, Bedok to the south and Pasir Ris to the north.

As part of the Singapore Urban Redevelopment Authority's (URA) Master Plan 2014, Paya Lebar Central was identified as one of the five growth areas. It was since earmarked as an up-and-coming commercial hub, in line with the wider decentralisation strategy to ensure the city's sustainable growth. Paya Lebar participates in the pilot Business Improvement District (BID) programme.

Although they have similar names, Paya Lebar Central, Paya Lebar MRT station and Paya Lebar Road are not part of Paya Lebar Planning Area, they are instead part of Geylang East, a planning subzone in Geylang. Paya Lebar itself contains five subzones; Airport Road, Paya Lebar East, Paya Lebar North, Paya Lebar West and Plab (Paya Lebar Air Base).

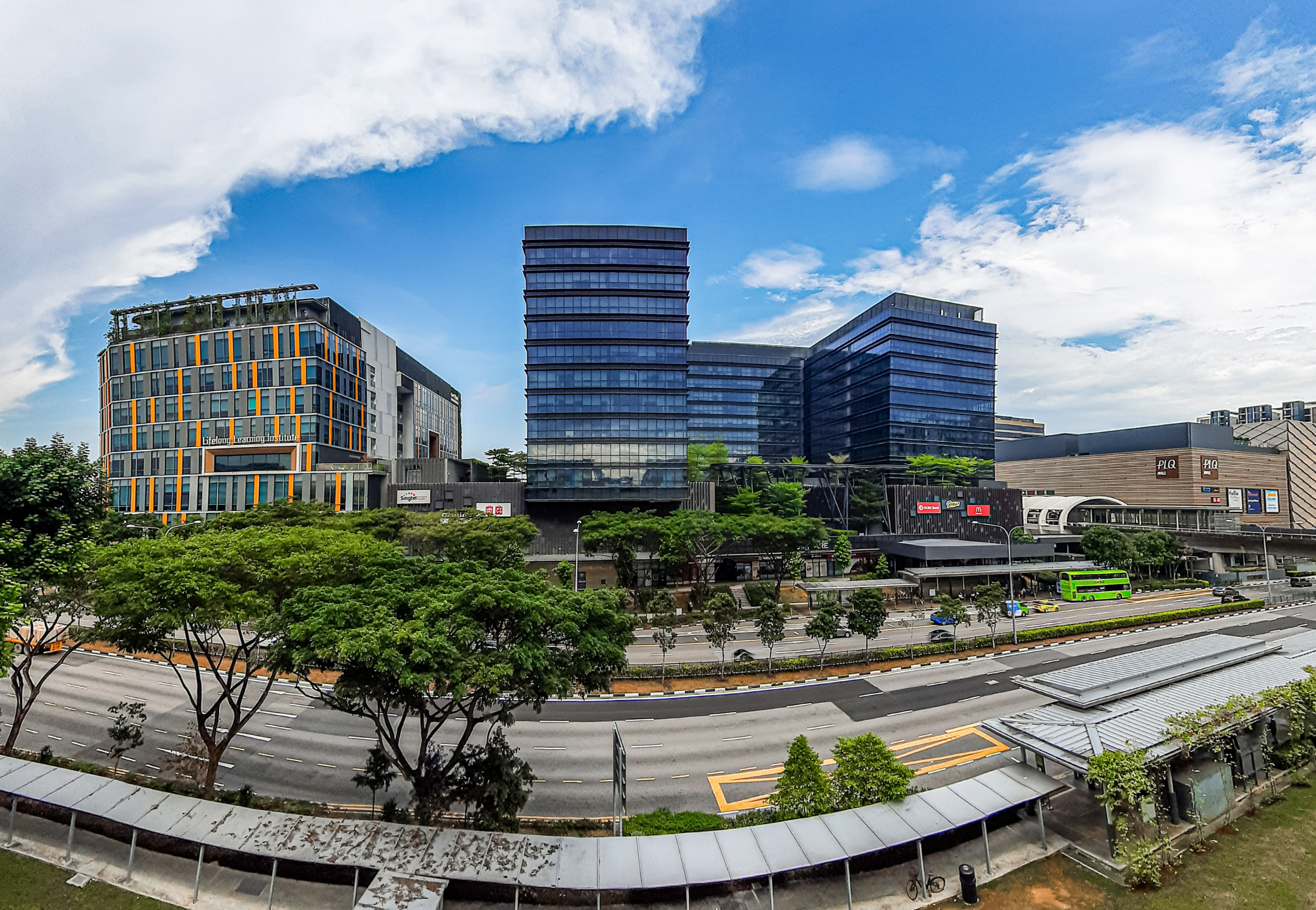
Paya Lebar Road

== Etymology and history ==
Paya Lebar was formerly a swamp close to Kallang River. In Malay, Paya means "swamp" and lebar means "wide".

Due to the swamp, the area mainly consisted of squatters who reared pig and poultry and also grew market produce.

In 1865, Richard Owen Norris bought part of the area and lived there with his family.

== Paya Lebar Air Base ==
The Singapore International Airport was built in Paya Lebar from 1952 to 1955, and opened on 20 August that year by the Secretary of State for the Colonies, Alan Lennox-Boyd. Singapore International Airport began to be gradually converted into a military air-force base from late 1967 onwards. It became a complete military airbase in 1981 when Singapore Changi Airport was opened and was subsequently renamed as Paya Lebar Air Base (PLAB) in the same year.

== Politics ==
Paya Lebar covers Aljunied GRC and Tampines GRC which were warded by the Workers' Party and the People's Action Party, respectively. One notable Member of Parliament for the ward was the former Secretary-General of the Workers' Party, Low Thia Khiang, where his ward covers a majority of Paya Lebar, including the Paya Lebar Air Base. Following his retirement, it was taken over by Gerald Giam.

From 2025, Paya Lebar will then be covered under Tampines GRC because of the development of Paya Lebar Airbase.

== See also ==
- Kallang–Paya Lebar Expressway
- Paya Lebar MRT station
