= Tampines Expressway =

Road in Singapore

Tampines Expressway
- Lebuhraya Tampines (Malay) 淡滨尼高速公路 (Chinese) தெம்பினீஸ் விரைவுச்சாலை (Tamil)

Route information
- Length: 14 km (8.7 mi)
- History: First section completed in June 1989, last section completed in August 1996

Major junctions
- West end: Seletar (CTE, SLE)
- CTE, SLE, KPE, PIE
- East end: Changi (PIE)

Location
- Country: Singapore
- Regions: Seletar, Sengkang, Punggol, Hougang, Pasir Ris, Tampines, Changi

Highway system
- Expressways of Singapore

The Tampines Expressway (TPE) is a highway in the north-eastern fringe of Singapore, joining the Pan Island Expressway (PIE) near Singapore Changi Airport in the east with the Central Expressway (CTE) and Seletar Expressway (SLE) in the north of the island.

== History ==
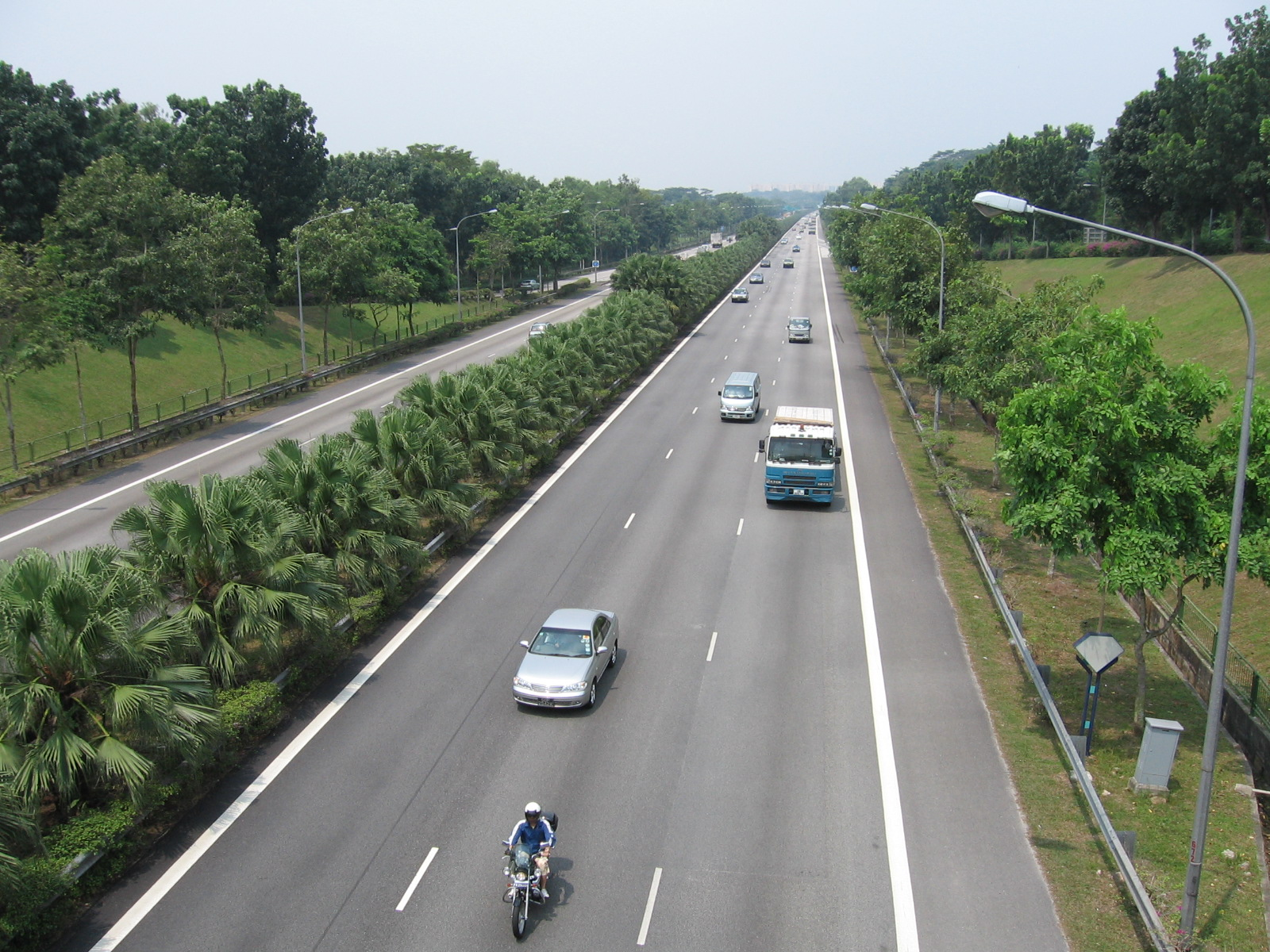
Tampines Expressway from Jalan Kayu Flyover.

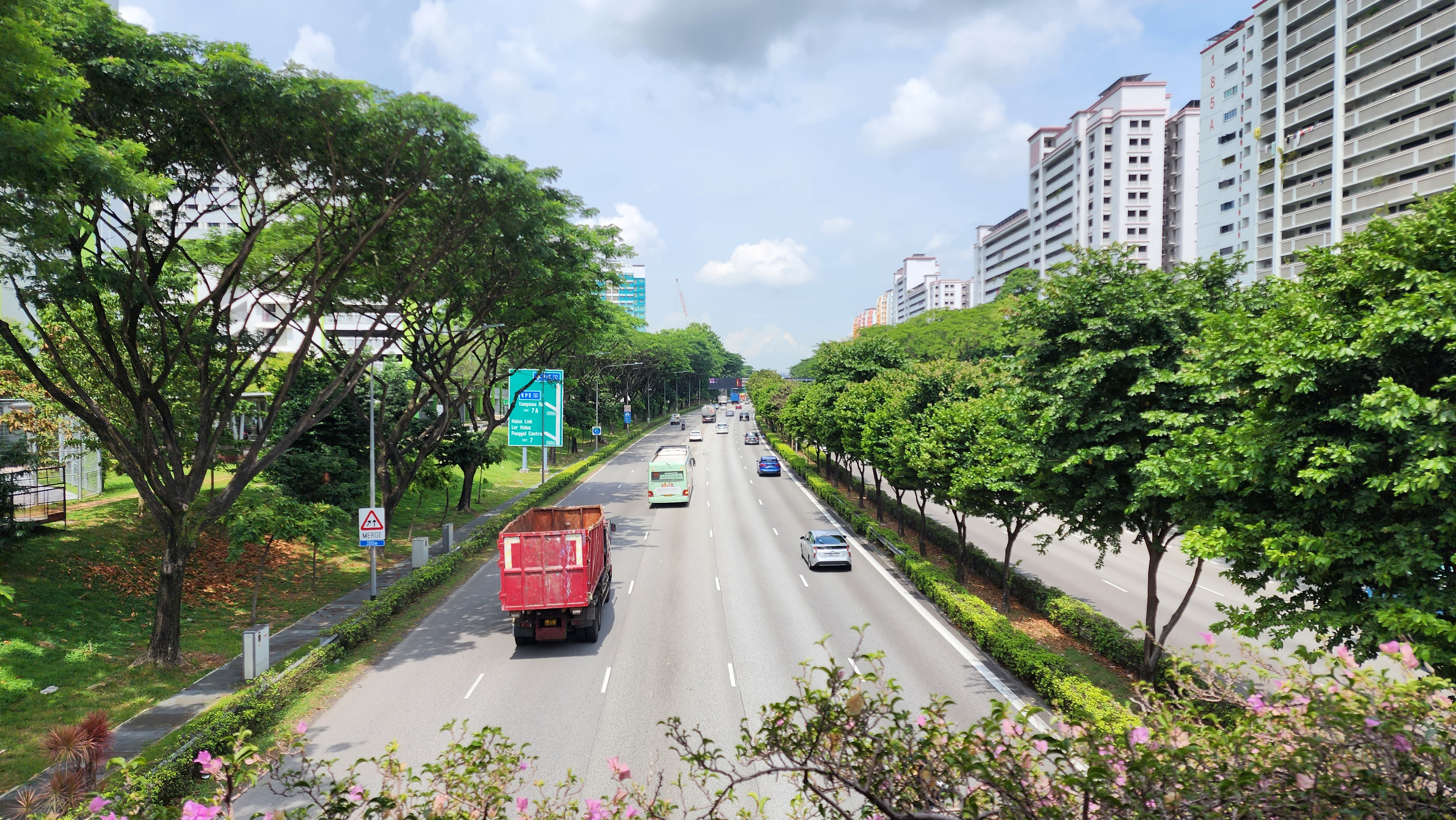
Tampines Expressway from Exit 9, Punggol Road heading towards Exit 7 and 7A

The expressway was constructed alongside the development of Tampines New Town in the 1980s. On 22 February 1986, tenders were called for the first section of the expressway. Work began on 5 August 1986 to widen the existing portions of Tampines Road. The first section of the expressway, stretching from the PIE to Elias Road, opened on 30 September 1987.

On 19 November 1987, the contracts for the second phase of the expressway were awarded to Sembawang Construction and Hock Lian Seng Engineering. Phase 2 of the expressway, stretching westward from Elias Road to Lorong Halus, began construction on 24 December 1987 and opened on 30 May 1989.

In the 1990s, extensions towards the west were made to connect the TPE with the CTE and SLE to serve the newer residential areas of Sengkang and Punggol and provide a continuous expressway link between the northern and eastern parts of the island. These extensions acquired much of Lorong Lumut, Lorong Halus Village, Cheng Lim Farmway, Jalan Kayu Village, Lorong Andong, Lorong Anchak and Boh Sua Tian Road. On 30 August 1992, the Public Works Department began construction of Punggol Flyover. On 13 April 1993, a local firm was awarded the tender to extend the TPE to Seletar. On 30 June 1994, the Public Works Department awarded a $38.9 million contract to Koh Brothers Building and Civil Engineering Contractor Pte Ltd for the construction of the Lorong Halus road interchange. The expressway was completed in August 1996 after the Lorong Halus interchange was completed.

In 1998, two new viaducts and a loop connecting the TPE and PIE were constructed to reduce travelling times between Pasir Ris, Tampines and Changi Airport.

On 19 Feb 2023, Tampines Viaduct was opened to the public. This newly constructed one-way viaduct eased access to the westbound PIE from the eastbound TPE using the new Exit 2A; previously, motorists had to cross a traffic-light junction between Upper Changi Road East and Upper Changi Road North for the same route. The viaduct was initially scheduled to open in early 2020, but fatal collapse occurred during construction of the viaduct in 2017, which resulted in one dead and 10 injured. Following the incident, the Land Transport Authority (LTA) announced that the project would be completed by another company instead, which resulted in the viaduct eventually completed after a three-year delay.

On 22 Jan 2024, the Seletar Link Flyover was opened to the public, subsequently followed by Sengkang West Drive on 7 Jan 2025. The flyover provides an alternative route to/from Seletar Link, which previously only provided westbound access via Exit 11 with additional link to Sengkang Town. The development of the flyover is intended to support the expected future growth in Sengkang Town as well as in neighbouring Punggol Town and Pulau Punggol Timor (an artificial island located north of Seletar).

== List of interchanges and exits ==
| Location | km | mi | Flyover | Exit | Destinations | Notes |
|---|---|---|---|---|---|---|
| Tampines | 0.0 | 0.0 | Upper Changi | — | PIE (towards Changi) | Eastern terminus; expressway continues as Pan Island Expressway (PIE) |
| Tampines | 0.2 | 0.12 | Upper Changi | 1A | Changi North Crescent, Changi North Industrial Park | Eastbound exit only |
| Tampines | 1.1 | 0.68 | Upper Changi | 1 | PIE, Upper Changi Road North, Upper Changi Road East, Bedok Town | Eastbound exit and westbound entrance only |
| Tampines | 1.3 | 0.81 | Loyang | 2 | Loyang Avenue, Pasir Ris Town, Changi Village, Tampines Avenue 7 | |
| Tampines | 1.9 | 1.2 | Tampines Viaduct | 2A | PIE (towards Tuas), Upper Changi Road East, Bedok Town | Eastbound exit only; exit was opened on 19 Feb 2023 |
| Tampines | 2.7 | 1.7 | Sungei Tampines | | | |
| Tampines | 3.3 | 2.1 | Pasir Ris | 3A | Tampines Avenue 12 | Signed as exits 3A, 3B (westbound) and 3C (eastbound) |
| Tampines | 3.5 | 2.2 | Pasir Ris | 3B | Pasir Ris Drive 1, Pasir Ris Drive 8 | Signed as exits 3A, 3B (westbound) and 3C (eastbound) |
| Tampines | 3.9 | 2.4 | Pasir Ris | 3C | Pasir Ris Drive 1, Pasir Ris Drive 8, Tampines Avenue 12 | Signed as exits 3A, 3B (westbound) and 3C (eastbound) |
| Tampines | 4.2 | 2.6 | — | 4 | Tampines Link (westbound); Elias Road (eastbound) | |
| Tampines | 4.9 | 3.0 | Api Api | 5 | Pasir Ris Drive 12, Tampines Avenue 10 | |
| Tampines | 6.7 | 4.2 | Tampines | 6 | KPE (towards ECP); Halus Link, Lorong Halus, Punggol Central | Signed as exits 6 (westbound) and exits 7, 7A (eastbound) |
| Sengkang | 7.5 | 4.7 | Tampines | 7A | KPE, Tampines Road | Signed as exits 6 (westbound) and exits 7, 7A (eastbound) |
| Sengkang | 7.6 | 4.7 | Tampines | Halus Bridge (Serangoon River) | | Signed as exits 6 (westbound) and exits 7, 7A (eastbound) |
| Sengkang | 7.9 | 4.9 | Tampines | 7 | Halus Link, Lorong Halus, Punggol Central | Signed as exits 6 (westbound) and exits 7, 7A (eastbound) |
| Sengkang | 9.1 | 5.7 | Punggol | 9 | Punggol Road | |
| Sengkang | 9.5 | 5.9 | Punggol West | 10 | Sengkang East Road, Punggol Way | |
| Sengkang | 11.3 | 7.0 | Punggol Bridge (Sungei Punggol) | | | |
| Sengkang | 11.6 | 7.2 | Seletar Link | 11 | Seletar Link, Sengkang West Drive | No eastbound entrance from Sengkang West Drive only |
| Sengkang | 12.6 | 7.8 | Jalan Kayu | 12 | Jalan Kayu, Seletar Aerospace Way, Sengkang West Road | |
| Sengkang | 13.2 | 8.2 | Seletar Aerospace | 13 | CTE (towards City), Yio Chu Kang Road | Westbound exit and eastbound entrance only |
| Sengkang | 14.7 | 9.1 | Seletar | 14 | Seletar West Link, Yishun Avenue 1 | Westbound exit and eastbound entrance only |
| Seletar | 15.8 | 9.8 | — | — | SLE | Western terminus; expressway continues onto Seletar Expressway (SLE) |
1.000 mi = 1.609 km; 1.000 km = 0.621 mi: Incomplete access; Route transition
