= Central Expressway, Singapore =

Expressway in Singapore

Coordinates: 1.34°N 103.86°E

Central Expressway
- Lebuhraya Tengah (Malay) 中央高速公路 (Chinese) மத்திய விரைவுச்சாலை (Tamil)

Route information
- Length: 15.8 km (9.8 mi)
- Existed: 1989–present
- History: First section opened on 17 June 1989, last section opened on 21 September 1991

Major junctions
- South end: Bukit Merah (AYE)
- SLE, TPE, ORRS (Braddell Road), PIE, NSC, AYE
- North end: Yio Chu Kang (SLE, TPE)

Location
- Country: Singapore
- Regions: Seletar, Ang Mo Kio, Serangoon, Kallang, Bishan, Toa Payoh, Central Area, Bukit Merah, Novena

Highway system
- Expressways of Singapore

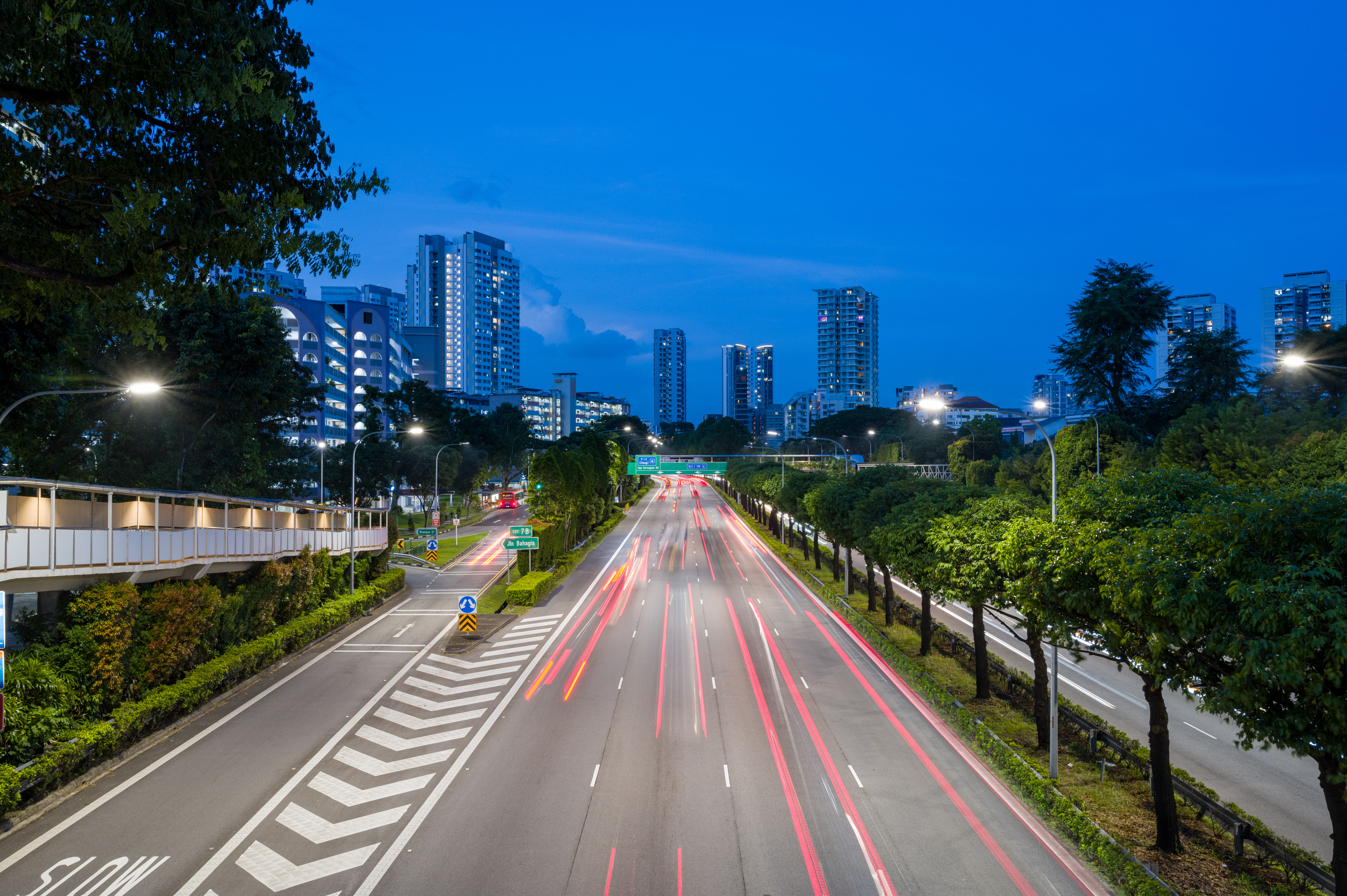
A long exposure of the CTE near Exit 7B (Jalan Bahagia).

The Central Expressway (CTE) is a major expressway in Singapore connecting the city centre with northern residential towns including Toa Payoh, Bishan and Ang Mo Kio, before linking to the Seletar Expressway (SLE) and Tampines Expressway (TPE).

== Route description ==
Beginning at a junction with the Ayer Rajah Expressway (AYE) in Bukit Merah, the expressway runs northeast, passing through Outram and parallel to Chin Swee Road. The CTE then runs through two tunnels between Chin Swee Road and Bukit Timah Road, with an at-grade segment between Buyong Road and Cairnhill Circle, before continuing northeast, between Kallang and Novena. The expressway then turns north, intersecting the Pan Island Expressway (PIE) and passing through Toa Payoh, Bishan and Ang Mo Kio before terminating at an interchange with the Seletar Expressway (SLE) and Tampines Expressway (TPE), and measures 16 kilometres (9.9 miles).

== History ==
=== Construction ===
Work on the first phase of the CTE, between Ang Mo Kio Avenue 1 and Thomson Road, commenced in July 1981. Intended to alleviate heavy traffic along Upper Thomson Road, a 3 kilometres (1.9 miles) segment of the expressway between Ang Mo Kio Avenue 1 and Jalan Toa Payoh opened in March 1983, while the segment of expressway between Jalan Toa Payoh and Thomson Road was opened on 18 May 1985 by MP for Moulmein Lawrence Sia. In August 1985, construction commenced on a 3 kilometres (1.9 miles), S$18 million segment of the expressway in Ang Mo Kio. This segment of expressway was opened to traffic in January 1987, while the 1.7 kilometres (1.1 miles) section between Ang Mo Kio Avenue 5 and Yio Chu Kang Road was constructed between August 1986 and November 1988.

The contract for the second phase of the CTE was awarded in December 1987. This phase, which comprised 3.7 kilometres (2.3 miles) of expressway between Bukit Timah Road and Chin Swee Road, included two tunnels, with lengths of 0.7 kilometres (0.43 miles) and 1.7 kilometres (1.1 miles), and involved the acquisition of land along Orchard Road and Clemenceau Avenue worth over S$20 million. Work on the second phase commenced in June 1987, and the tunnels were constructed using the cut-and-cover method. As the areas along the expressway's route were heavily built-up, precautions were taken to limit disruption to the public during construction, with the exclusive use of hydraulic piling machines and work near residential areas being paused at night. In addition, cofferdams were built in the Singapore River to facilitate construction of the expressway tunnels, and to prevent erosion, the river bed directly above the tunnels was covered with rocks. The segment of expressway between Outram Road and the Ayer Rajah Expressway opened in September 1988, but the construction of the tunnels was delayed, which the government attributed to a shortage of workers and "poor soil conditions near Cairnhill Circle". Construction on the CTE's second phase was completed in May 1991, and the opening of the two tunnels, which were named the Kampong Java and Chin Swee Tunnels, in September 1991 marked the completion of the expressway.

=== Impact and expansion ===
Traffic volumes along the CTE rose after the expressway was fully opened, and in May 1994, the section of expressway between Ang Mo Kio Avenue 1 and the PIE was expanded to eight lanes to ease traffic congestion. A traffic monitoring system, the Expressway Monitoring and Advisory System, was introduced on the expressway in March 1998. By the late 1990s, the CTE faced traffic congestion issues, and while a road pricing scheme was introduced to rectify the issue, it was unable to eliminate it.

In 2008, a large-scale improvement of the CTE was initiated, and the first phase of the scheme, consisting of the expansion of the expressway between Ang Mo Kio Avenues 1 and 3, started in June 2008, and cost S$17 million. Subsequently, flyovers were constructed at the junction with the PIE to improve traffic flow, while other sections of the CTE, between Bukit Timah Road and Yio Chu Kang Road, were widened, and the improvement scheme was completed by December 2011.

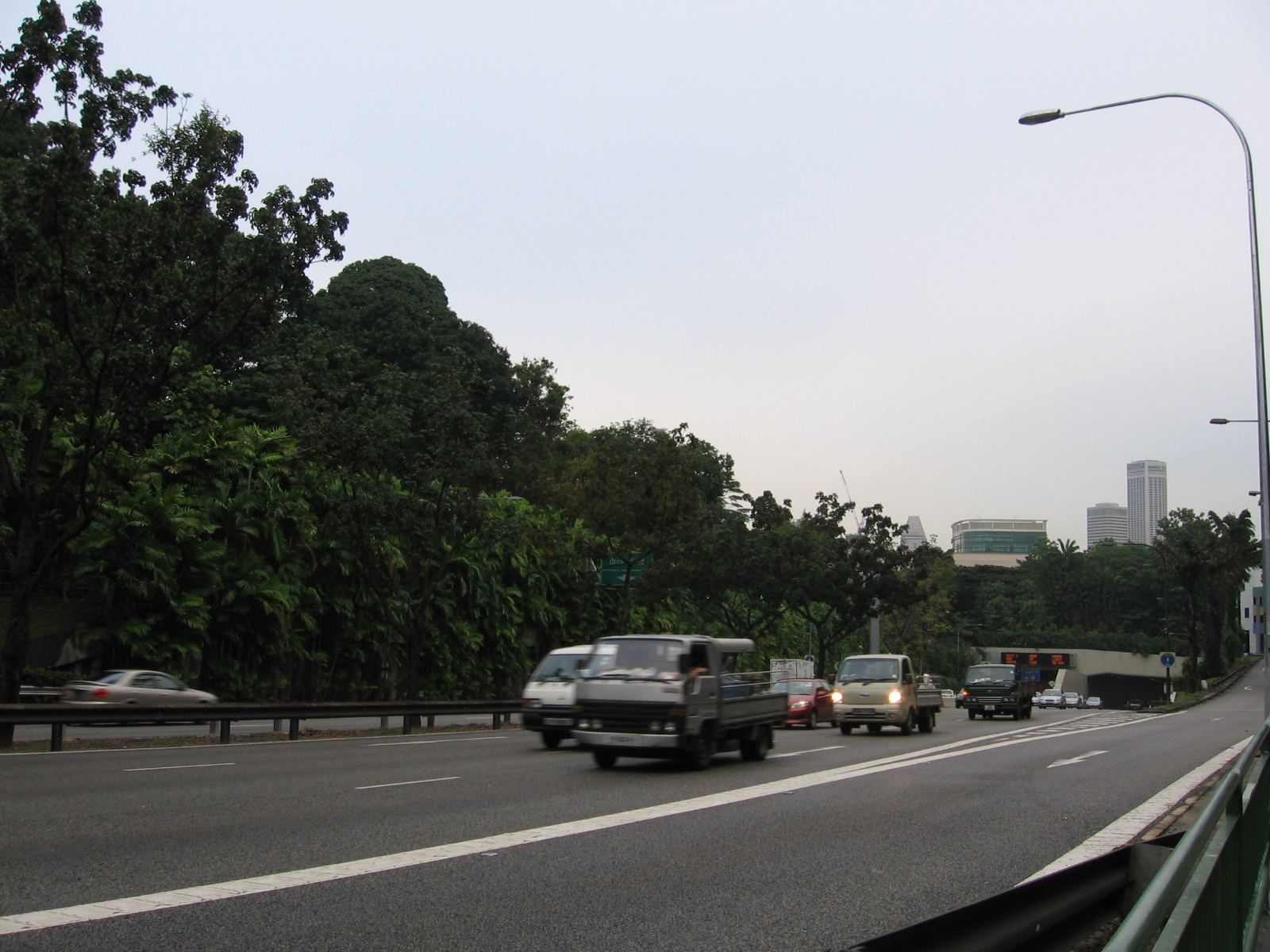
Central Expressway near the Cavenagh Road exit in December 2005.

== List of interchanges and exits ==
Location	km	mi	Flyover	Exit	Destinations	Notes
Bukit Merah	0	0.0	Radin Mas	—	AYE (towards Tuas)	Southern terminus, expressway continue as AYE; No Access to AYE (towards MCE)
Bukit Merah	0.7	0.43	Bukit Merah	1A	Jalan Bukit Merah	Southbound exit and northbound entrance only
Bukit Merah	1.4	0.87	Outram	1B	Outram Road; Tiong Bahru Road	
Outram	2	1.2	Southern Portal of Chin Swee Tunnel			
Singapore River	2.1	1.3	—	2	Clemenceau Avenue	Northbound exit only
Singapore River	2.2	1.4	—	2	Merchant Road	Northbound exit and southbound entrance only Both bounds exit 2 accessible via Eu Tong Sen Street and New Bridge Road
Singapore River	2.6	1.6	—	2	Havelock Road	Southbound exit and northbound entrance only Northbound entrance via Upper Cross Street; Both bounds exit 2 accessible via Eu Tong Sen Street and New Bridge Road
Orchard	3.8	2.4	Northern Portal of Chin Swee Tunnel			
Orchard	4	2.5	—	4	Orchard Road	Southbound exit and northbound Entrance only
Newton	4.4	2.7	Southern Portal of Kampong Java Tunnel			
Newton	4.7	2.9	—	5	Cairnhill Circle	Southbound exit and northbound Entrance only
Novena	5.2	3.2	Northern Portal of Kampong Java Tunnel			
Novena	5.5	3.4	—	6	Bukit Timah Road	Southbound exit and northbound Entrance only
Novena	6.3	3.9	—	7A	Moulmein Road	Northbound exit and southbound entrance only Southbound entrance via Balestier Road
Novena	6.8	4.2	Moulmein	7C	Balestier Road (Northbound); Moulmein Road	Southbound exit and northbound entrance only Northbound entrance via Balestier Road (Southbound)
Novena	7.2	4.5	—	7D	Balestier Road (Southbound)	Southbound exit only
Novena	7.5	4.7	—	7B	Jalan Bahagia	Northbound exit only
Kallang	8.2	5.1	Whampoa	8A	PIE (towards Tuas); Kim Keat Link; Lorong 6 Toa Payoh	Southbound exit and northbound entrance only
Toa Payoh	8.3	5.2	Whampoa	8B	PIE (towards Changi); Upper Serangoon Road	Access via northbound exit Signed as 8B in southbound direction
Toa Payoh	9	5.6	Braddell	10	Braddell Road	Access via northbound exit Signed as 10 in southbound direction
Serangoon	10.1	6.3	Braddell	8B	PIE (towards Changi); Upper Serangoon Road	Access via southbound exit Signed as 8B in northbound direction
Serangoon	10.2	6.3	Braddell	10	Braddell Road	Access via southbound exit Signed as 10 in northbound direction
Ang Mo Kio	11.3	7.0	Ang Mo Kio South	11	Ang Mo Kio Avenue 1	
Ang Mo Kio	12.6	7.8	Ang Mo Kio Central	12A	Ang Mo Kio Avenue 3	Access via northbound exit
Ang Mo Kio	12.8	8.0	Ang Mo Kio North	12B	Ang Mo Kio Avenue 5	Access via northbound exit
Ang Mo Kio	14.1	8.8	Ang Mo Kio North	14	Ang Mo Kio Avenue 5 Ang Mo Kio Avenue 3	Access via southbound exit
Ang Mo Kio	15.1	9.4	Yio Chu Kang	15	Yio Chu Kang Road	Northbound exit and southbound entrance only Access to southbound exit and northbound entrance from SLE & TPE
Ang Mo Kio	15.3	9.5	Yio Chu Kang & Seletar	16	Seletar West Link (towards Yishun Avenue 1)	Northbound exit and southbound entrance only Access to southbound exit and northbound entrance from SLE & TPE
Ang Mo Kio	15.4	9.6	—	—	SLE (towards BKE)	Northern terminus, expressway continues as SLE
1.000 mi = 1.609 km; 1.000 km = 0.621 mi: Incomplete access; Route transition
