= Upper Thomson (subzone) =

Coordinates: 1°21′27.4″N 103°49′56.23″E

- Subzone of Bishan Planning Area

Other transcription(s)
  - Chinese: 汤申上段
  - Tamil: அப்பர் தாம்சன்
- Interactive map of Upper Thomson
- Country: Singapore
- Region: Central Region
- Planning Area: Bishan

Upper Thomson (Chinese: 汤申上段, Tamil: அப்பர் தாம்சன்) is a subzone within the planning area of Bishan, Singapore, as defined by the Urban Redevelopment Authority (URA). Its boundary is composed of Ang Mo Kio Avenue 1 in the north; Marymount Road in the east; Braddell Road and Lornie Road in the south; and the planning area of Central Water Catchment in the west.
