= Expressways of Singapore =

Expressways of Singapore 新加坡高速公路 Rangkaian Lebuhraya Singapura சிங்கப்பூர் விரைவுச்சாலைகள்
- Symbol of the Singaporean expressways

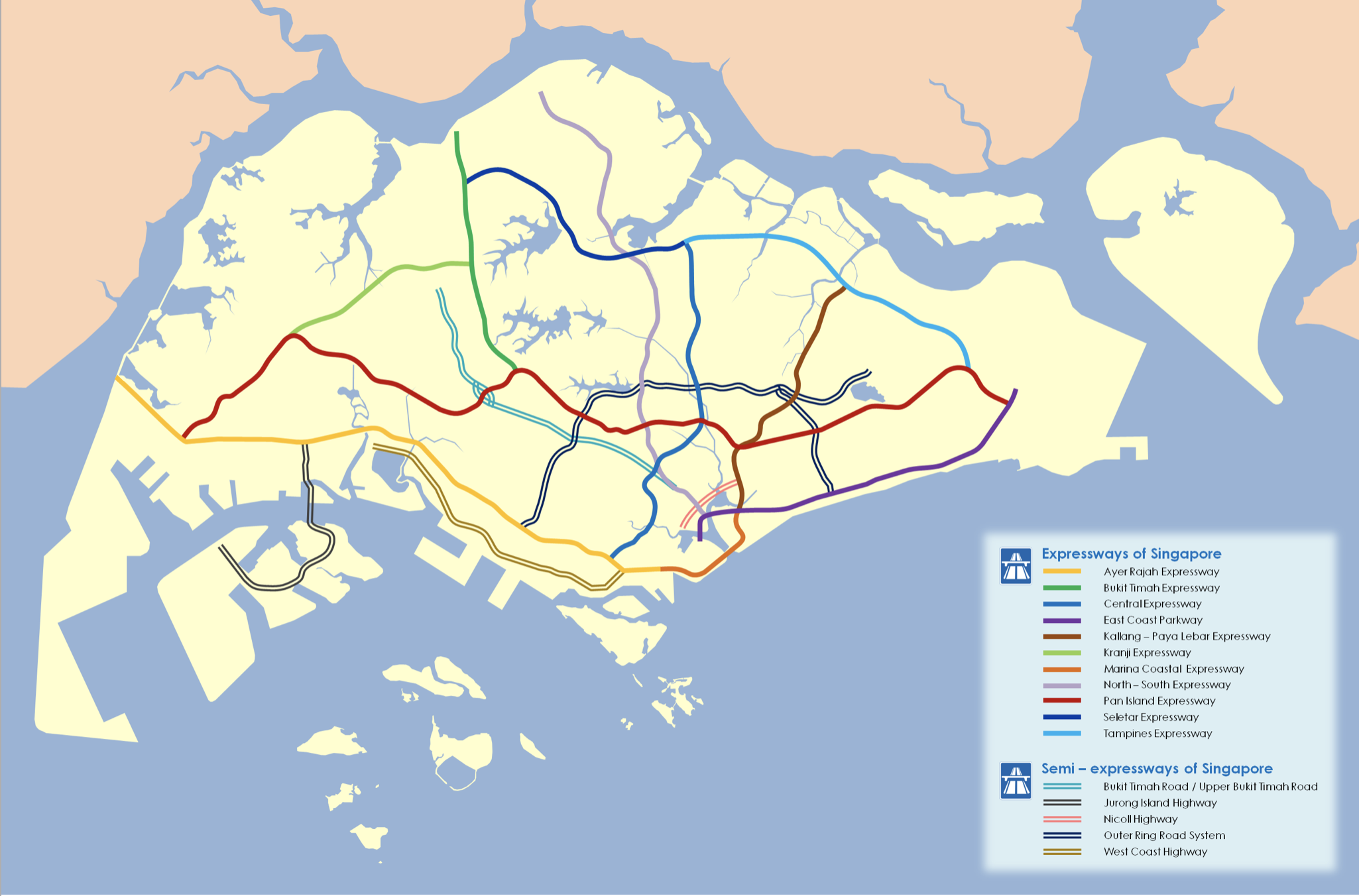
- Map of the Singaporean expressway network as of 2012

System information
- Maintained by Land Transport Authority (LTA)
- Length: 163 km (101 mi)
- Formed: 1966

Highway names
- Expressways: Expressway AAA (AAA)

System links
- Expressways of Singapore

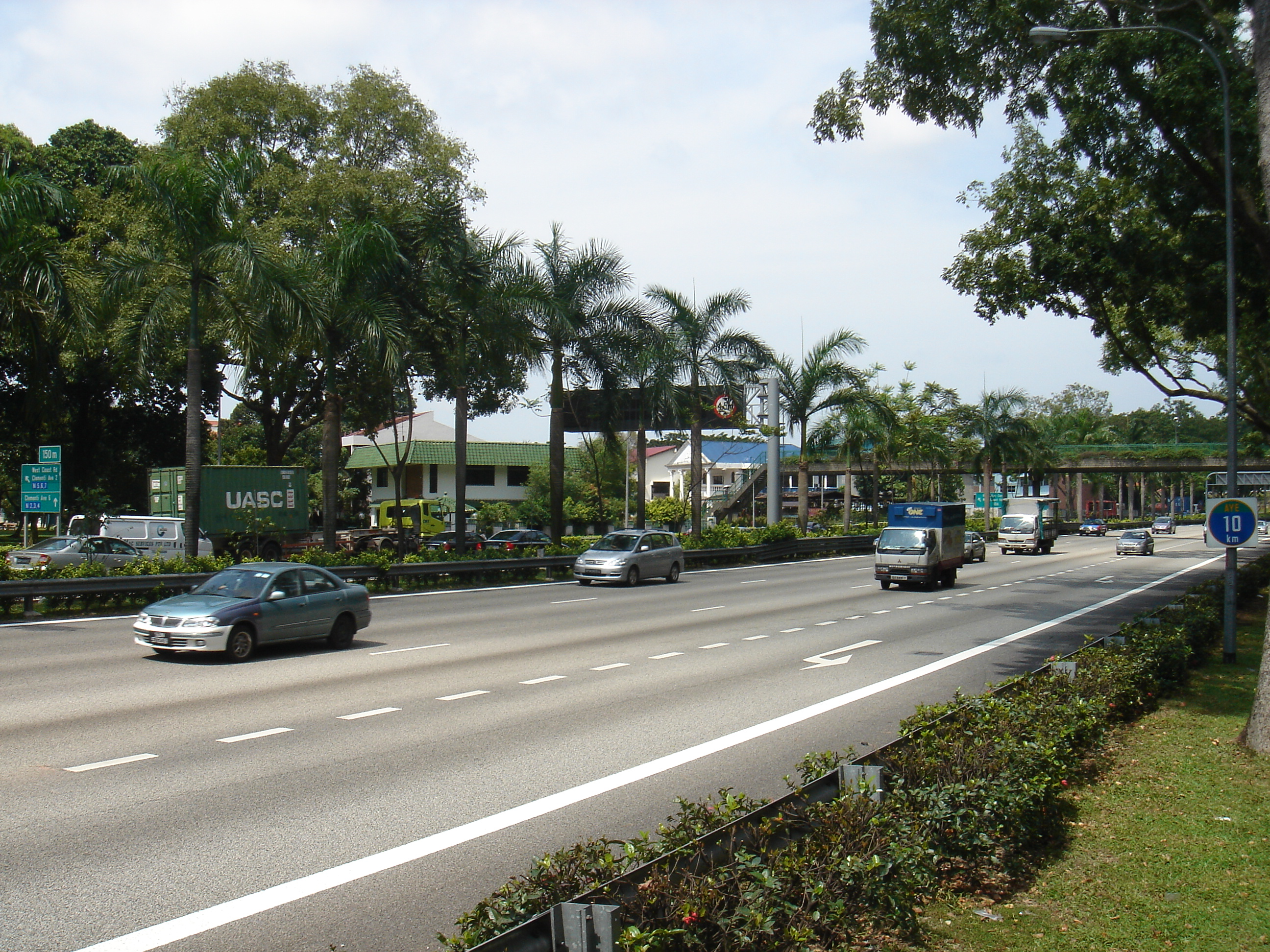
Clementi section of the Ayer Rajah Expressway.

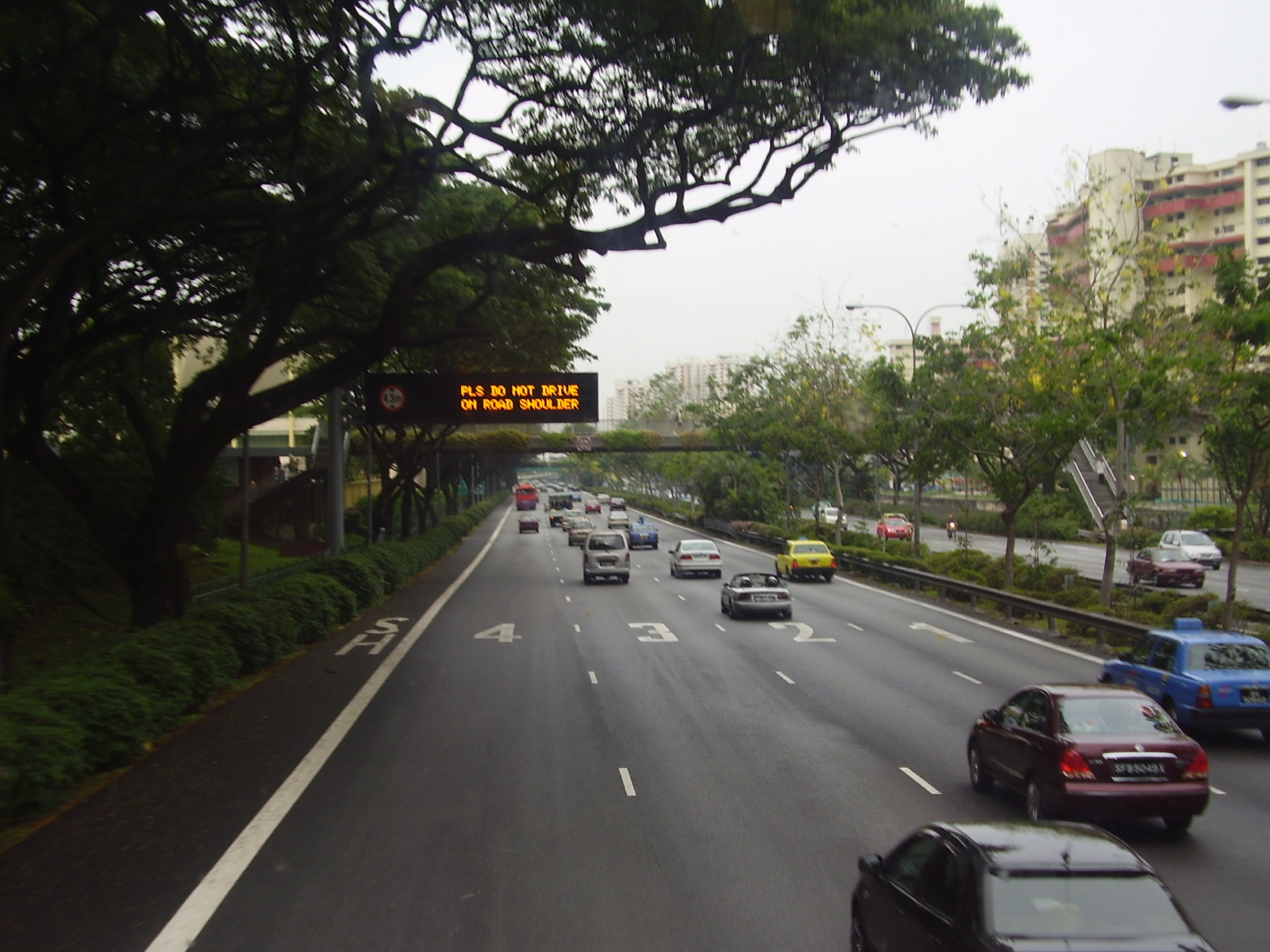
The Pan Island Expressway at Toa Payoh. Lines for lane, shoulder and median, as well as lane numbers and an EMAS signboard, are all visible in the photo.

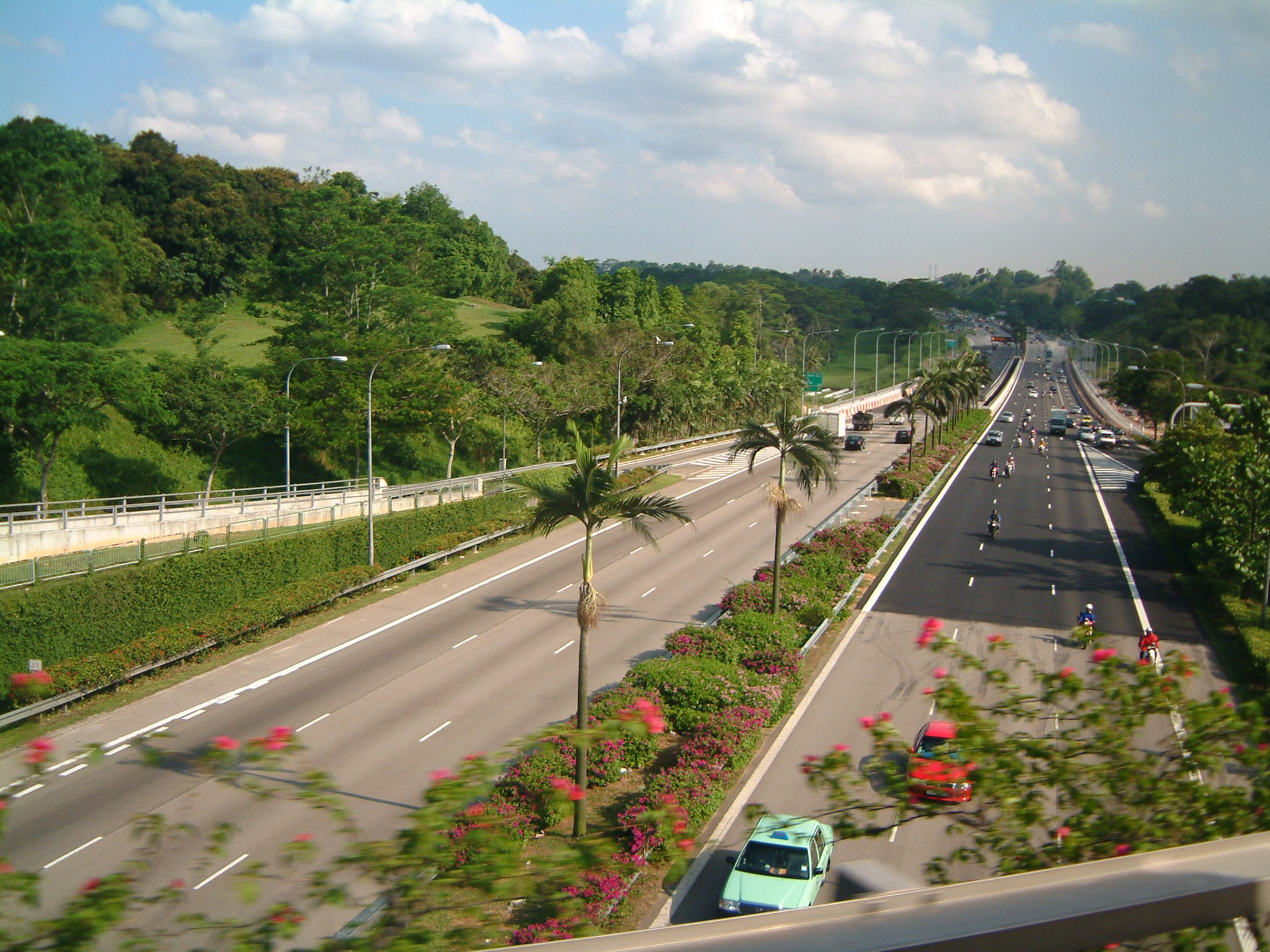
The Bukit Timah Expressway is part of the Asian Highway Network.

The expressways of Singapore are a system of controlled-access highways in Singapore that allow motorists to travel quickly from one urban area to another. Construction of the system was authorised when construction of the Pan Island Expressway began in 1962. They usually have three to four lanes in each direction, although there are two-lane carriageways at many expressway intersections and five-lane carriageways in some places. There are currently ten expressways and the last expressway, North-South Corridor is under construction.

Construction on the first expressway, the Pan Island Expressway, started in 1966. As of 2014, there are 163 kilometres (101 mi) of expressways in Singapore.

The Singaporean expressway networks are connected with Malaysian expressway networks via the Ayer Rajah Expressway (connects with the Second Link Expressway via the Malaysia-Singapore Second Link bridge) and the Bukit Timah Expressway (connects with the Johor Bahru Eastern Dispersal Link Expressway via Johor–Singapore Causeway).

== History ==
Chronology of major events
Date	Events	Remarks
15 April 1962	Construction of the Pan Island Expressway (PIE) begins.	Construction during full internal self-government of Singapore
8 May 1966	First phase of the Pan Island Expressway (PIE) completed. Construction of the second phase of the PIE begins.	Whitley Road: Mount Pleasant Flyover - Thomson Flyover - Jalan Toa Payoh - Jalan Kolam Ayer - Paya Lebar Way
14 December 1970	Toa Payoh Flyover, Singapore's first flyover is opened to motorists.	Length: 1.2 kilometres
23 January 1971	Construction of the East Coast Parkway (ECP) begins with the land reclamation of East Coast.	
12 December 1974	First phase of the East Coast Parkway (ECP) completed.	Fort Road – Marine Parade; Formerly called Bedok Highway
15 July 1975	Planning for the Sembawang Expressway begins from Ang Mo Kio Avenue 3 to Ang Mo Kio Avenue 1.	
22 February 1976	Second phase of the East Coast Parkway (ECP) completed.	Marine Parade – Bedok South Road; Formerly called Bedok Highway
30 September 1976	Section of the Pan Island Expressway (PIE) completed and opened.	Adam Road - Jalan Anak Bukit
1 January 1977	Planning for the Sembawang Expressway was extended to Yio Chu Kang Road.	
19 January 1980	Section of the Pan Island Expressway (PIE) completed and opened.	Whitley Road - Adam Road
22 January 1980	Third phase of the East Coast Parkway (ECP) completed.	Bedok South Road – Changi Airport; It was renamed to East Coast Parkway
15 March 1980	Third phase of the Pan Island Expressway (PIE) completed.	Jalan Eunos - Changi Airport
25 April 1980	Section of the Pan Island Expressway (PIE) completed and opened.	Hong Kah Drive - Jalan Boon Lay
25 October 1980	Section of the Pan Island Expressway (PIE) completed and opened.	Jalan Eunos - Bedok North Road
10 January 1981	Section of the Pan Island Expressway (PIE) completed and opened.	Bedok North Road - East Coast Parkway
29 January 1981	Section of the Pan Island Expressway (PIE) completed and opened.	Hong Kah Drive - Jalan Anak Bukit
18 April 1981	Opening of the Benjamin Sheares Bridge on the East Coast Parkway (ECP) and the completion of the ECP phase 4 from Fort Road to Keppel Road.	ECP Length: 20 kilometres ECP phase 4: Fort Road - Keppel Road
11 July 1981	Construction of the Sembawang Expressway (renamed to Central Expressway) begins.	
20 December 1981	Fourth phase of the Pan Island Expressway (PIE) completed.	Jalan Anak Bukit - Jurong Road
5 March 1983	Construction of the Ayer Rajah Expressway (AYE) begins.	
31 March 1983	Opening of the Central Expressway (CTE) Phase 1.	Ang Mo Kio Avenue 1 - PIE
23 September 1983	Construction of the Bukit Timah Expressway (BKE) begins.	
18 May 1985	Opening of the Central Expressway (CTE) Phase 1.	PIE - Thomson Road
22 January 1986	Opening of the Bukit Timah Expressway (BKE).	Length: 10 kilometres
1 July 1986	Construction of the Central Expressway (CTE) phase 2 including Kampong Java Tunnel and Chin Swee Tunnel.	Cavenagh Road was closed to make way for the construction of Central Expressway.
16 July 1987	Public telephones along the Bukit Timah Expressway, Central Expressway, East Coast Parkway, Pan Island Expressway and Ayer Rajah Expressway were converted into exclusively emergency phones by 6 pm yesterday. Only calls for assistance to the police, fire and ambulance and breakdown service are possible from 74 emergency telephones.	
30 September 1987	Opening of the Tampines Expressway (TPE) phase 1.	PIE - Elias Road
24 December 1987	Construction of the Tampines Expressway (TPE) phase 2.	Elias Road - Lorong Halus
24 September 1988	Construction of the Central Expressway (CTE) phase 2 from Ayer Rajah Expressway to Outram Road.	
5 November 1988	Opening of the Ayer Rajah Expressway (AYE).	Keppel Viaduct - Jurong Town Hall Road
15 April 1989	Opening of the Seletar Expressway (SLE) phase 1.	Lentor Avenue - Upper Thomson Road
2 June 1989	Opening of the Tampines Expressway (TPE) phase 1.	Elias Road - Old Tampines Road
17 June 1989	Opening of the Central Expressway (CTE) phase 1.	Yio Chu Kang Road – Ang Mo Kio Avenue 1 Opened by: Mr Heng Chiang Meng
24 March 1990	Opening of the Seletar Expressway (SLE) phase 1.	Yio Chu Kang Road – Lentor Avenue
11 May 1991	The completion of the Central Expressway (CTE) phase 2 including Kampong Java Tunnel and Chin Swee Tunnel.	Length: 15.8 kilometres
21 September 1991	Opening of the Central Expressway (CTE) phase 2 including Kampong Java Tunnel and Chin Swee Tunnel.	Length: 15.8 kilometres
31 October 1991	Construction of the Kranji Expressway (KJE) begins.	
5 December 1993	Opening of the Pan Island Expressway (PIE).	Jurong Road - Upper Jurong Road
20 February 1994	Opening of the Kranji Expressway (KJE).	Length: 8 kilometres
29 November 1994	Construction of the Ayer Rajah Expressway (AYE) phase 2 begins.	Jurong Town Hall Road - Corporation Road
5 November 1995	Opening of the Seletar Expressway (SLE) phase 2.	Bukit Timah Expressway – Woodlands Avenue 2
3 September 1996	Opening of the Tampines Expressway (TPE) phase 2.	Old Tampines Road - SLE
2 January 1998	Opening of the Ayer Rajah Expressway (AYE) phase 2.	Jurong Town Hall Road - Tuas Second Link
22 February 1998	Opening of the Seletar Expressway (SLE) phase 2.	Length: 10.8 kilometres Woodlands Avenue 2 - Upper Thomson Road Opened by: Mr John Chen Seow Phun, Minister of State for Communications
22 August 1998	Opening of the Tampines Expressway viaduct connecting PIE and TPE.	
September 1998	The Electronic Road Pricing (ERP) systems is implemented on all expressways.	
2001	Construction of the Kallang-Paya Lebar Expressway begins.	
2004	The SOS telephones were removed on all expressways except for tunnels.	
23 June 2007	Opening of the Tampines Service Road, currently part of the Kallang-Paya Lebar Expressway (KPE).	
26 October 2007	Opening of the Kallang–Paya Lebar Expressway (KPE), the longest subterranean road tunnel in Southeast Asia.	ECP - PIE
March 2008	Construction of the Marina Coastal Expressway (MCE) begins.	
20 September 2008	Official opening of the Kallang-Paya Lebar Expressway (KPE).	Prime Minister Lee Hsien Loong; PIE - TPE
29 December 2013	Opening of the Marina Coastal Expressway (MCE), Singapore's first undersea expressway.	Length: 5 kilometres The East Coast Parkway was shortened to Sheares Avenue.

== Expansion ==
The latest expressway completed is the 5 km Marina Coastal Expressway (MCE), which links the East Coast Parkway and Kallang-Paya Lebar Expressway to Marina South and Ayer Rajah Expressway and includes Singapore's first undersea tunnel. Construction started in 2008 and the expressway opened to traffic 29 December 2013. Prior to construction of the Marina Coastal Expressway, the Kallang–Paya Lebar Expressway which runs for 12 km, 9 km of which are 10 metres underground, was started in 2001 and a 3 km section linking the Pan Island Expressway and East Coast Parkway was opened in late 2007. The Kallang–Paya Lebar Expressway was completed on 20 September 2008.

Construction of the 11th expressway, the North–South Corridor, originally conceptualised as the North-South Expressway, was announced on 30 January 2008. The new 21.5-kilometre expressway will cost about S$7.47 billion when fully completed by 2029 and will connect the East Coast Parkway with the northern parts of Singapore. In 2016, the Land Transport Authority announced that the North–South Corridor will be Singapore’s first integrated transport corridor featuring continuous bus lanes and cycling trunk routes, rather than a normal expressway when originally conceptualised.

== Features ==
Like all other global controlled-access expressway network, there are no traffic lights on the expressways. At an interchange with another road, an expressway is connected to it via slip roads. This allows traffic to change routes without having to stop or slow down. Due to the need to conserve space in land-scarce Singapore, there are no cloverleaf interchanges on the entire island as they are too large. Instead, traffic efficiency and land space are maximised by having traffic lights on terrestrial roads, as well as the usage of interchanges such as stack interchanges. The most common forms of highway-road or highway-highway intersections are single-point urban, diamond, and trumpet interchanges. Newer expressways such as the Kallang-Paya Lebar Expressway and the future North South Corridor uses on-ramps and off-ramps to conserve space even further and minimise disruption to the road system, through the construction of viaducts and tunnels.

The road surface is asphalt, unlike normal roads which may have concrete surfaces. The lanes are separated with white dashed lines, while unbroken white lines are used to mark the edges of the median and shoulder. The shoulder is designated for stops in cases of breakdowns and emergencies, and driving on it is prohibited by law. Lanes are numbered from right to left, with lane 1 being the closest to the median. Crash barriers, cat's eyes and rumble strips are also used to ensure road safety.

There are signs marking the start and end of an expressway at its entry and exit points respectively. The expressways are also assigned route codes consisting three letters that form their respective initials, making the Singaporean expressway network as the only highway system with route coding system. The Expressway Monitoring and Advisory System is used on all the expressways—cameras are used for live monitoring of expressway conditions, and LED signboards display information messages, such as warnings of any disruptions to the normal flow of traffic, as well as estimated travel times. The longest expressway, the Pan Island Expressway, is only 41 km (25 mi) long and therefore has no rest areas.

Singaporean expressways are the only highway network in Singapore with their own route codes. They are assigned with three-letter codes named after their respective initials where the last letter is always E; for example, PIE for the Pan Island Expressway. The only exception is the East Coast Parkway (ECP) whose the last letter is other than E.

== Safety ==
The default speed limit and National Speed Limits on Singapore expressways is 90 km/h (56 mph), but in certain areas a lower speed limit such as 80 km/h (50 mph) or 70 km/h (43 mph) is applied, especially in large urban areas, tunnels, heavy traffic and crosswinds. Speed traps are also deployed by the Singapore police at many places along the expressways and are deployed from 7am to 12am.

Certain types of transport, such as pedestrians, bicycles, and learner drivers, are not allowed.

== List of expressways ==
List of expressways sorted by length
Rank	Name	Abbreviation	Opened	Length	Exit termini	Remarks
1st	Pan Island Expressway	PIE	1966	42.8 km (26.6 mi)	Changi Airport, ECP; Tuas, AYE	Longest and oldest expressway in Singapore. Designated as AH2 from Stevens Road exit to BKE exit .
2nd	Ayer Rajah Expressway	AYE	1988	26.5 km (16.5 mi)	MCE; Tuas Checkpoint, Tuas Second Link	Directly connected to MCE. Part of AH143.
3rd	North–South Corridor	NSE	2029 (planned)	21.5 km (13.4 mi)	Admiralty Road West; ECP, Republic Avenue and Nicoll Highway	Construction started in 2018, and is now estimated to be complete by 2029. The NSC will be Singapore’s first integrated transport corridor featuring continuous bus lanes and cycling trunk routes. It will be the last expressway built in Singapore.
4th	East Coast Parkway	ECP	1974	16 km (9.9 mi)	Changi Airport, PIE; Sheares Avenue	
5th	Central Expressway	CTE	1989	15.8 km (9.8 mi)	SLE, TPE; AYE	This expressway has two tunnels, Kampong Java Tunnel and Chin Swee Tunnel. Directly connected to SLE.
6th	Tampines Expressway	TPE	1989	14 km (8.7 mi)	SLE, CTE; PIE; Upper Changi Road East	
7th	Kallang–Paya Lebar Expressway	KPE	2008	12 km (7.5 mi)	MCE, ECP; TPE	The expressway has the longest road tunnel in Singapore. Directly connected to MCE. Part of AH143.
8th	Seletar Expressway	SLE	1990	10.8 km (6.7 mi)	BKE, Turf Club Avenue; CTE	Directly connected to CTE.
9th	Bukit Timah Expressway	BKE	1986	10 km (6.2 mi)	PIE; Woodlands Checkpoint, Johor–Singapore Causeway	Part of AH2.
10th	Kranji Expressway	KJE	1994	8 km (5.0 mi)	BKE; PIE	
11th	Marina Coastal Expressway	MCE	2013	5 km (3.1 mi)	AYE; Fort Road, ECP, KPE	Singapore's first undersea expressway. Directly connected to KPE and AYE. Part of AH143.

== Semi-expressways ==
Singapore also has five semi-expressways: Bukit Timah Road, Jurong Island Highway, Nicoll Highway, the Outer Ring Road System (ORRS) and West Coast Highway. These semi-expressways are scaled down versions of expressways, without a uniform speed limit. Some sections still feature traffic light controlled junctions, such as the eastern section of the ORRS, some of Bukit Timah Road, the southern section of the Jurong Island Highway and the western sections of Nicoll Highway and West Coast Highway. However, much like with the expressways, semi-expressways allow motorists to travel quickly from one urban area to another with the use of viaducts, overpasses and tunnels.

== See also ==
- Land Transport Authority
- Ministry of Transport (Singapore)
