= Bukit Timah Expressway =

Controlled-access highway

Coordinates: 1.3915°N 103.7721°E

Bukit Timah Expressway
- Lebuhraya Bukit Timah (Malay) 武吉知馬高速公路 (Chinese) புக்கிட் தீமா விரைவுச்சாலை (Tamil)

Route information
- Part of AH2
- Length: 10 km (6.2 mi)
- Existed: 1983–present
- History: Completed in 1986

Major junctions
- North end: Woodlands Checkpoint (Johor–Singapore Causeway)
- SLE, KJE, PIE
- South end: Bukit Timah (PIE)

Location
- Country: Singapore
- Regions: Woodlands, Bukit Panjang, Bukit Timah

Highway system
- Expressways of Singapore

The Bukit Timah Expressway (BKE) is a highway in Singapore that starts at the Pan Island Expressway in Bukit Timah and travels north to the Woodlands Checkpoint and the Johor–Singapore Causeway in Woodlands.

== History ==
On 22 May 1982, tenders were called to build the expressway and construction began thereafter. Construction of the expressway began in 1983 and it was built in two stages, the first stage from Woodlands to Mandai Road and the second from Mandai Road to the Pan-Island Expressway. Due to the hilly nature of the Bukit Timah area the second stage of the expressway went through, explosives were used to clear the area for construction. During the construction, the new road, Bukit Panjang Road was opened from BKE all the way to Woodlands Road, and new interchanges at Mandai Road and Woodlands Road were also added as well. Kampong roads were demolished such as Jalan Kwok Min, Lorong Kingkit and Lorong Garpu. The small section of Jalan Kwok Min remains and Singapore Armed Forces took over the Jalan Kwok Min area since 1997. It was opened in December 1985.

Before the Kranji Expressway was completed, BKE was the shortest expressway in Singapore, at about 10 km (6.2 mi). This expressway is a six-lane dual carriageway, with three lanes on either side. In 2003, the LTA began work to convert a section of the expressway, from the intersection with the Kranji Expressway to that with the Seletar Expressway, into an eight-lane dual carriageway with four lanes on either side. This was completed in mid-2005.

== List of interchanges and exits ==
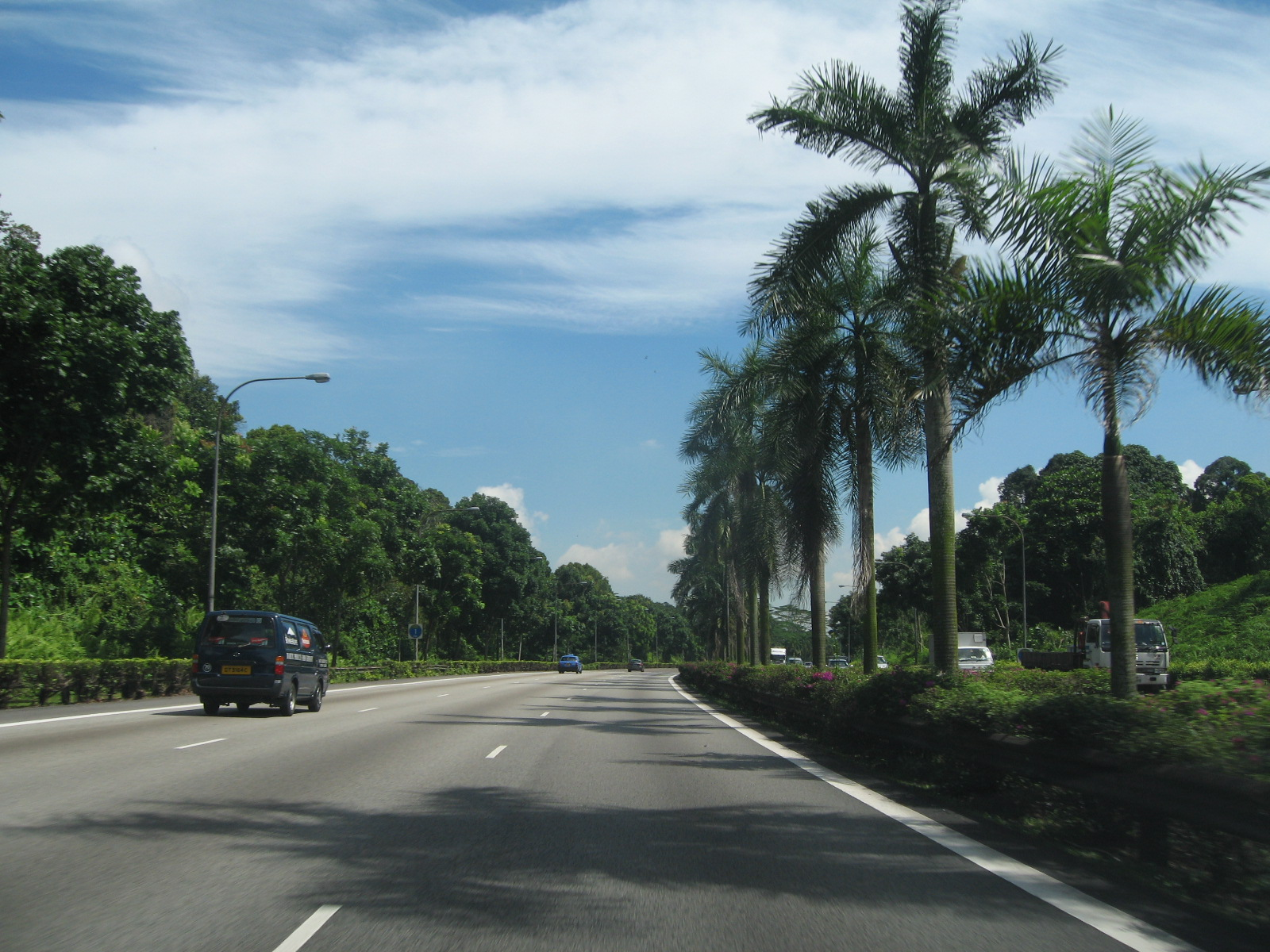
Bukit Timah Expressway, northbound direction heading towards Johor Bahru, Malaysia.

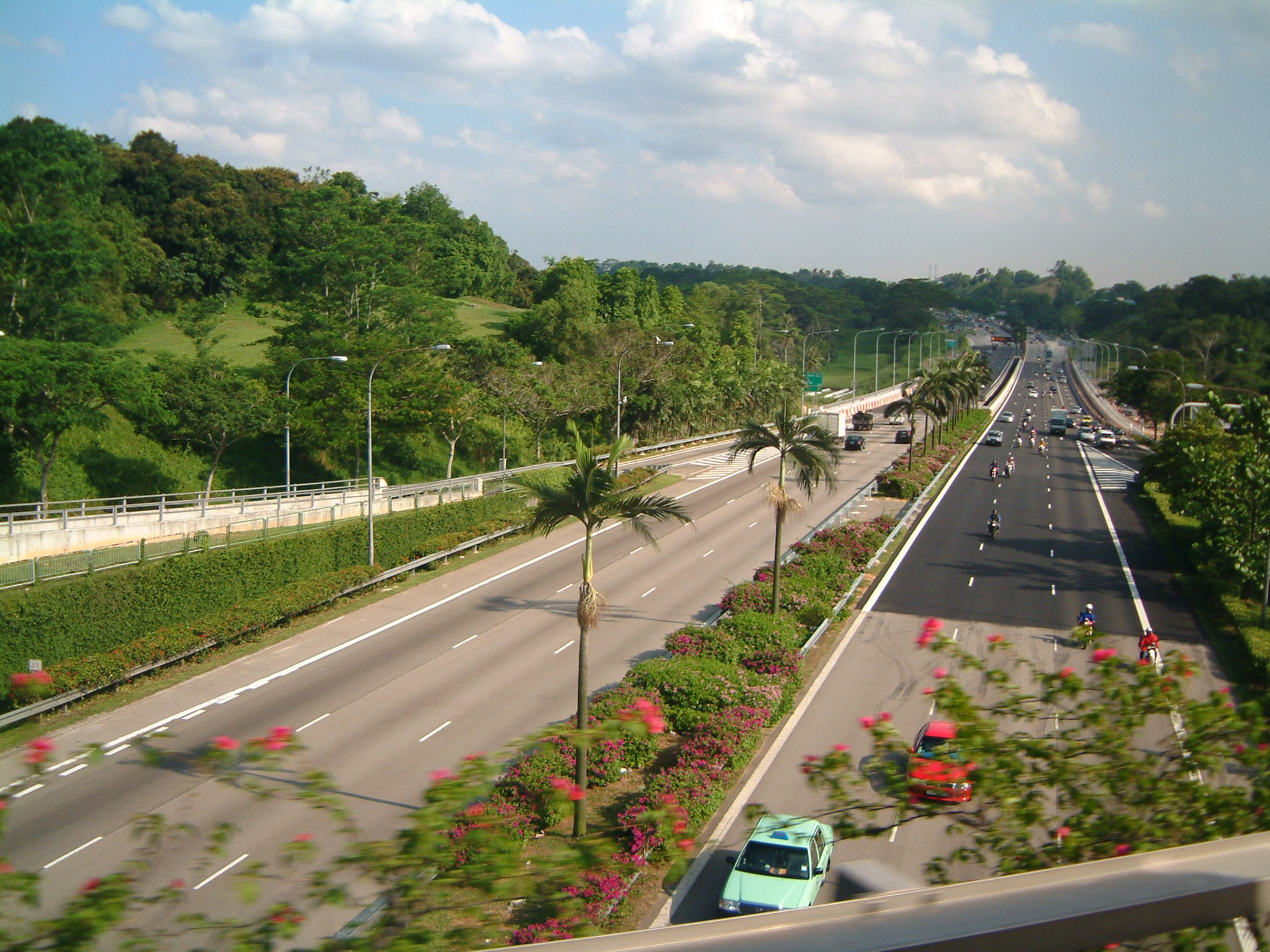
Bukit Timah Expressway, looking south towards the PIE.

Location	km	mi	Flyover	Exit	Destinations	Notes
Bukit Timah	0.0	0.0	Chantek	—	PIE (towards Tuas)	Southern terminus; expressway continues as Pan Island Expressway (PIE)
Bukit Timah	0.6	0.37	Chantek	1	PIE (towards Changi)	
Bukit Panjang	2.2	1.4	Dairy Farm	2	Dairy Farm Road, Upper Bukit Timah Road	
Bukit Panjang	3.5	2.2	Zhenghua	3	Bukit Panjang, Choa Chu Kang Road	
Bukit Panjang	5.0	3.1	Gali Batu	5	KJE (towards PIE)	
Sungei Kadut	7.3	4.5	Mandai	7	Mandai Road	
Sungei Kadut	8.5	5.3	Woodlands South	8	SLE (towards CTE); Turf Club Avenue	
Sungei Kadut	9.4	5.8	Woodlands South	9	SLE (towards CTE); Turf Club Avenue	
Sungei Kadut	9.7	6.0	Woodlands	10A	Woodlands Avenue 3	Northbound exit and southbound entrance only
Sungei Kadut	10.6	6.6	Woodlands Checkpoint Viaduct	10B	Woodlands Road, Woodlands Centre Road	Northbound exit and southbound entrance only
Sungei Kadut	10.6	6.6	Woodlands Checkpoint Viaduct	—	Johor–Singapore Causeway	Northern terminus; expressway continues as Woodlands Crossing, Johor–Singapore Causeway via Woodlands Checkpoint
1.000 mi = 1.609 km; 1.000 km = 0.621 mi: Incomplete access; Route transition

== See also ==
- AH2
- Expressways in Singapore
