= Kranji Expressway =

Road in Singapore

Coordinates: 1.3907°N 103.7660°E

Kranji Expressway
- Lebuhraya Kranji (Malay) 克兰芝高速公路 (Chinese) கிராஞ்சி விரைவுச்சாலை (Tamil)

Route information
- Length: 8 km (5.0 mi)
- Existed: 1990–present
- History: Completed in 1994

Major junctions
- Southwest end: Jurong (PIE)
- PIE, BKE
- East end: Bukit Panjang (BKE)

Location
- Country: Singapore
- Regions: Jurong, Choa Chu Kang, Bukit Panjang

Highway system
- Expressways of Singapore

The Kranji Expressway (abbreviation: KJE) in Singapore connects from the BKE in Bukit Panjang and travels south-west to join with the PIE in Jurong West. Construction of the expressway started in 1990 and was completed in 1994. The expressway is also the second shortest of all the expressways in Singapore at about 8 kilometres (5.0 mi), with the shortest currently being the Marina Coastal Expressway (MCE).

== History ==
The new expressway was announced in 1990. It passes through the housing estates in Jurong, Choa Chu Kang and Bukit Panjang, ending near the subzone of Kranji.

It was completed in six stages. One of the most difficult jobs in laying the expressway was the clearing of large granite for which 300 kg of explosives were used. It had five different construction contracts. The entire network of linking roads came about by the construction of a highway connecting PIE at Hong Kah and BKE at Zhenghua. It was inaugurated on 4 March 1995 by Lim Hng Kiang.

It replaces some roads - Hong Kah Road, Hong Kah Lane, Jalan Beka, Jalan Pelawan, Jalan Jelawi, Jalan Dedali, Lorong Merawan, Lorong Kerubut, Jalan Beras, Jalan Bungar, Jalan Buey, part of Jalan Sabit, Lorong Puyu, Lorong Dengkes, Jalan Ara, Jalan Chapa, Lorong Jelubu and Kadlin Lane.

== List of interchanges and exits ==
Location	km	mi	Flyover	Exit	Destinations	Notes
Bukit Panjang	0.0	0.0	Gali Batu	—	BKE	Northern/eastern terminus; expressway continues as Bukit Timah Expressway (BKE)
Bukit Panjang	0.5	0.31	Senja	1A	Senja Road, Woodlands Road (westbound); Senja Road, Bukit Panjang Ring Road (northbound)	
Choa Chu Kang	1.9	1.2	Yew Tee	1	Woodlands Road, Upper Bukit Timah Road (westbound); BKE (towards SLE), Mandai Road (northbound)	
Choa Chu Kang	2.4	1.5	Yew Tee	2	Woodlands Road, Upper Bukit Timah Road	Northbound entrance and exit only
Choa Chu Kang	2.9	1.8	Choa Chu Kang East	3	Choa Chu Kang Drive, Choa Chu Kang Way	Westbound exit and northbound entrance only
Choa Chu Kang	4.2	2.6	Choa Chu Kang West	4	Choa Chu Kang Drive, Choa Chu Kang Way	Northbound exit and westbound entrance only
Tengah	4.7	2.9	Lam San	5	Brickland Road, Sungei Tengah Road, Old Choa Chu Kang Road	
Tengah	7.9	4.9	Tengah	7	PIE (towards Changi), Corporation Road	
Tengah	8.4	5.2	Tengah	—	PIE (towards Tuas), AYE	Western/southern terminus; expressway continues as Pan Island Expressway (PIE)
1.000 mi = 1.609 km; 1.000 km = 0.621 mi: Incomplete access; Route transition
