= Jalan Boon Lay =

Road in Singapore

Jalan Boon Lay (Chinese: 惹兰文礼) is a major road in Jurong West, Singapore. Travelling in a north–south direction, Jalan Boon Lay connects the junctions of Jurong West Avenue 4, Jurong West Avenue 2 and Jalan Bahar in the north with the junctions of Jurong Pier Road, Jurong Hill Flyover, Jalan Ahmad Ibrahim and Ayer Rajah Expressway in the south.

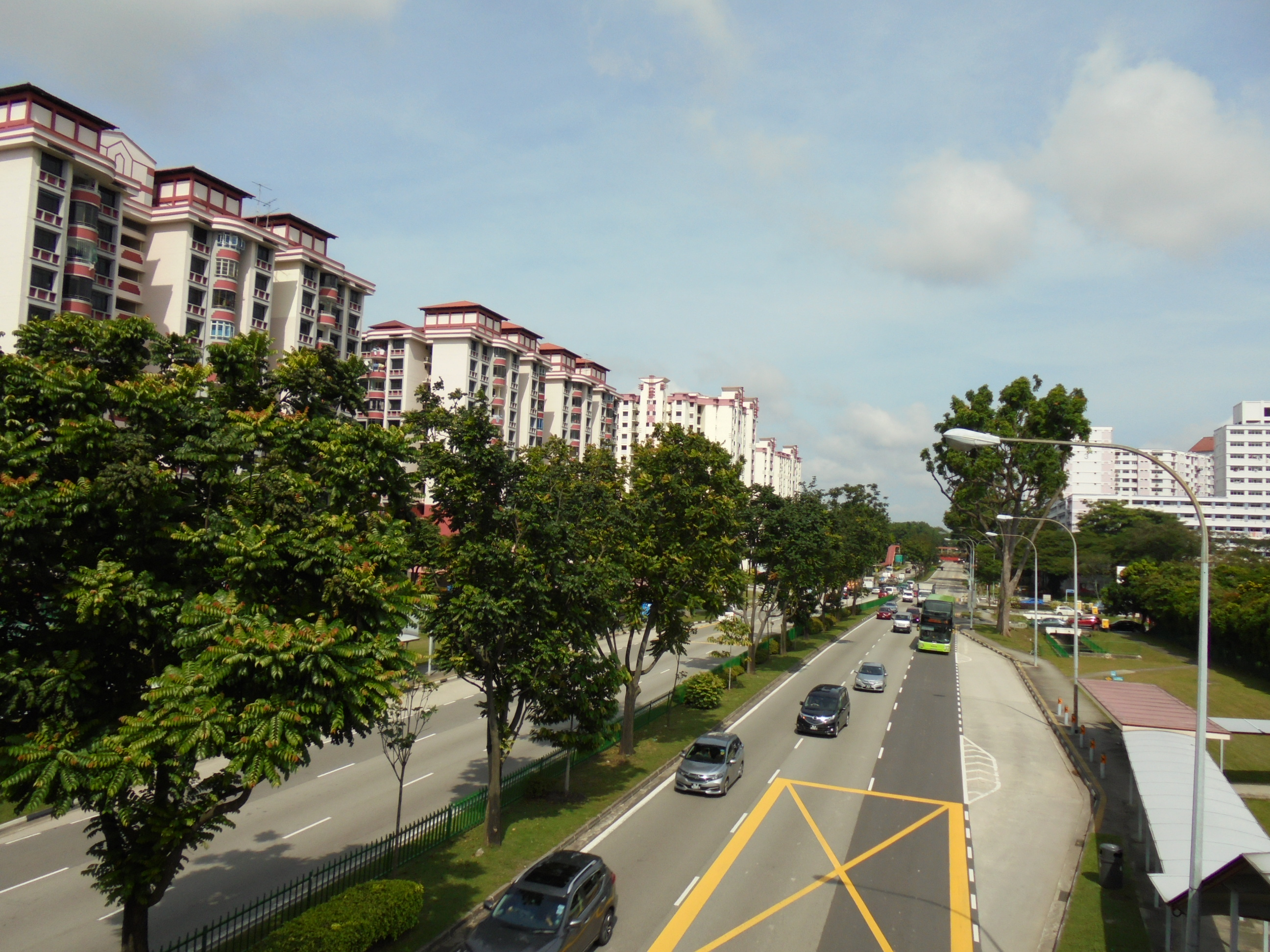
A section of Jalan Boon Lay in 2018.

== Etymology and history ==
The road was previously known as "Boon Lay Road" in the 1950s. It was named after Chew Boon Lay (Chinese: 周文礼; pinyin: Zhōu wén lǐ), one of Singapore's early pioneers and a successful businessman. The land in which Jalan Boon Lay and its adjacent areas once belonged to Chew and it was acquired by the colonial government sometime in the late 1940s and 1950s.

During the 1960s, when Singapore became a state of Malaysia, it used the prefix "Jalan" and many other Malay roads were paved in the area as industrialization grew, including "Jalan Pabrik" (Renamed to "Jurong Port Road") and "Jalan Utasan" (Renamed to "International Road"). During this time, the road was realigned and a part of the old road was renamed "Jalan Boon Lay Lama". The part of it has since been defunct.

== Today ==
Located in the precinct of Boon Lay Place, Jalan Boon Lay is a major arterial road, linking Jalan Ahmad Ibrahim and Jalan Bahar. The road has spawn several other roads and landmarks named in Chew's honor, including "Boon Lay Way" and "Boon Lay Crescent" all located within Boon Lay Housing Estate. The road also serves as the western boundary of Boon Lay Place. The road currently features a mixture of industrial and housing estates and can get quite congested during peak hours, especially at the intersection of Boon Lay Way and Jalan Boon Lay.

== Landmarks ==
Landmarks located along Jalan Boon Lay include:

- Jurong Central Park
- River Valley High School
- ST Kinetics/STA Inspection Centre
