= Pan Island Expressway =

Road in Singapore

Coordinates: 1.3267638°N 103.8287954°E

Pan Island Expressway
- Lebuhraya Rentas Pulau (Malay) 泛島高速公路 (Chinese) தீவு விரைவுச்சாலை (Tamil)

Route information
- Part of AH2
- Length: 42.8 km (26.6 mi)
- Existed: 1966–present
- History: First section completed in 1969, last section completed in 1992

Major junctions
- West end: Tuas (AYE)
- AYE, KJE, BKE, ORRS (Adam Road), NSC, CTE, KPE, TPE, ECP
- East end: Changi South (ECP)

Location
- Country: Singapore
- Regions: Jurong, Bukit Timah, Toa Payoh, Geylang, Bedok, Tampines, Kallang, Tuas, Changi, Bukit Batok, Novena

Highway system
- Expressways of Singapore

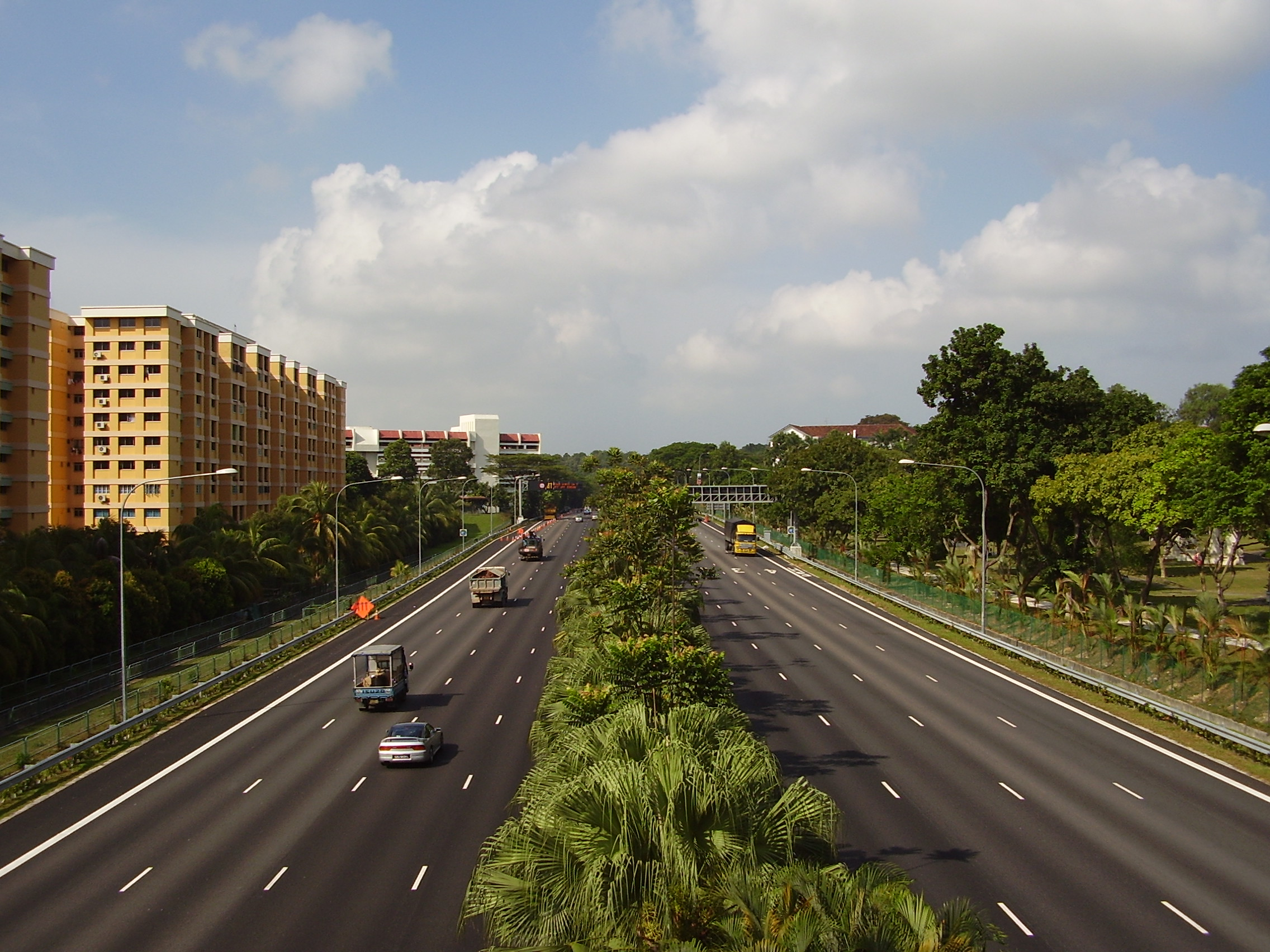
The PIE extension after Nanyang Flyover, looking towards Tuas.

The Pan Island Expressway (Abbreviated as: PIE) is the oldest and longest expressway in Singapore. It is also Singapore's longest road. The expressway runs from the East Coast Parkway near Changi Airport in the east to Tuas in the west and has a total length of 42.8 kilometres (26.6 miles).

Initially conceived by the Public Works Department in the 1960s as part of road expansions for handling rising traffic volumes, work on the PIE commenced in 1964. The first section, Jalan Toa Payoh, was completed by 1969. Construction of the other segments of the expressway were carried out in the 1970s. The initial expressway, from Jalan Boon Lay to the East Coast Parkway, was completed in June 1982. The PIE was then realigned and extended further westward to Tuas between 1991 and 1993. By the 1990s, the expressway was able to handle large amounts of traffic. The expressway and the interchanges along its route were expanded in the 1990s and 2000s to alleviate traffic congestion.

== Route ==
The Pan Island Expressway measures 42.8 kilometres (26.6 miles) and is the longest expressway in Singapore. Beginning at a junction with the East Coast Parkway near Changi Airport, the expressway runs northwest to intersect the Tampines Expressway. It then curves southwest, passing through Tampines, Bedok and Geylang before intersecting the Kallang-Paya Lebar Expressway and curving northwest, before heading west and running along the southern edge of Toa Payoh. From Toa Payoh, the expressway runs along the northern edge of Bukit Timah, curving southwest to meet the Bukit Timah Expressway, before heading west once again at Clementi Avenue 6. The PIE then travels along the northern edges of Clementi, Jurong East and Jurong West before ending at a junction with the Ayer Rajah Expressway at Tuas Road.

== History ==
=== Plans ===
The PIE was initially conceived by the Public Works Department as part of plans to expand Singapore's road network in the 1960s to cope with a predicted large rise in traffic volume over the next two decades, this was the first expressway built by the late Prime Minister Lee Kuan Yew. It was the result of a four-year planning study conducted in 1967 by the Singaporean government and foreign planning consultants. The study was funded by the United Nations Development Programme.

Intended to connect Singapore's satellite towns and industrial estates, it would act as the main connector between the parts of Singapore and would handle high traffic volumes.

=== Construction ===
Construction of the PIE started in 1964 and took place in four phases. Jalan Toa Payoh, a 2-mile (3.2 km) long segment of the expressway between Thomson Road and Woodsville Circus, was completed in June 1969 and the segment between Woodsville Circus and Jalan Eunos, named Jalan Kolam Ayer and Paya Lebar Way, was completed by 1970. Work on the 8-mile (13 km) long section between Jalan Anak Bukit and Thomson Road began in March 1970. During the construction of this section of the expressway, rocks had to be excavated near Adam Road. Also, Kampong Chantek Bahru, off of Bukit Timah Road, was cleared to make way for the expressway.

In January 1975, the section of the expressway between Jalan Eunos and Kallang Bahru was completed, and Jalan Kolam Bahru, between Kallang Bahru and Woodsville Circus, was improved to form a part of the expressway. The section between Adam Road and Jalan Anak Bukit was opened in October 1976 and construction of the eastern part of the PIE, between Jalan Eunos and Changi Airport, started in 1976.

Work was started in November 1977 to expand Whitley Road to six lanes, along with the construction of a grade-separated interchange to link it with the PIE. The section of the expressway between Adam Road and Whitley Road was completed by 1978 and was opened to traffic in 1979. Construction from Jalan Anak Bukit to Boon Lay Road was started in 1978. To connect this section to the rest of the PIE, a $15.2 million viaduct over Jalan Anak Bukit and Upper Bukit Timah Road was built.

On 10 January 1981, the 10-kilometre (6.2-mile) segment of the PIE between Jalan Eunos and the East Coast Parkway was officially opened by Teh Cheang Wan, the then Minister of National Development, having cost $50 million to construct. The section of the expressway between Upper Bukit Timah and Corporation Road was opened soon after on 31 January 1981 by Lee Yiok Seng, the Parliamentary Secretary of National Development at the time. With the completion of two flyovers across Aljunied Road and Paya Lebar Road in June 1982—three months ahead of schedule—the PIE was fully opened.

=== Impact and expansions ===
Upon its opening, the Pan Island Expressway had a positive impact on traffic flow in certain areas by alleviating traffic, as was reported by a preliminary Public Works Department study in October 1981. From 1983 to 1984, two lanes, one in each direction, were added to the 16.4-kilometre (10.2-mile) section of the expressway between Mount Pleasant Road and Jalan Boon Lay.

By the early 1990s, the expressway was handling considerable traffic but experienced traffic congestion during peak hours. To alleviate this, portions of the PIE, such as the Woodsville interchange and the intersection with the Central Expressway, were upgraded in May 1991 at a cost of $180 million. In addition, service roads were constructed along the expressway near Toa Payoh and at the Woodsville interchange.

Work began on an 8-kilometre (5.0-mile) extension of the expressway from Hong Kah Circle to Tuas in October 1991, with a northward realignment and extension of the expressway from Hong Kah Circle to Pioneer Road North. Intended to serve as a connection to the Jurong industrial estate and Jurong West, the extension cost $81.3 million and was opened in December 1993. The original alignment of the PIE became the present-day Jurong West Avenue 2.

As the amount of traffic using the KJE and PIE to the Jurong industrial estate increased, the Land Transport Authority upgraded the stretch of the PIE between Tengah Flyover and Tuas Road to a four-lane dual carriageway from the previous three lanes. The work started in March 2004 and was finished in March 2006.

Plans to connect the PIE together with Bedok North Avenue 3 were planned since September 2005, with construction began in May 2006 and completed on 29 November 2008, which provides a direct connection from Bedok to the PIE, after complaints over many years.

Beginning July 2011, the stretch of the PIE between Clementi Avenue 6 and Adam Road was widened; one lane was added to both sides of the expressway. As well, the Eng Neo, Chantek and Anak Bukit Flyovers were structurally expanded. The widened portions were progressively opened to traffic from July 2013.

In July 2019, PIE Exit 26A (Dunearn & Clementi Rd), known for its exit being on the right instead of being sited at the left, began construction for relocation of its exit to be relocated on the left as many faced confusion and some being unable to filter to the rightmost lane to exit, thereby missing the exit. The new relocated exit on the left opened to public on 28 May 2023, with a new vehicular underpass being built to integrate traffic seamlessly back to Jln Anak Bukit, where the old exit leads to. Despite the process of the relocation construction, there were no diversions or delay of traffic.

On 29 September 2020, the LTA announced that it would build a new flyover along the PIE near to the current exit 32, and a road junction underneath it in order to connect the new Tengah town's Tengah Boulevard to the PIE and Jurong, in addition to widening the PIE between the Hong Kah and Bukit Batok flyovers. The LTA announced in September 2024 that slip roads between PIE (Changi) and Tengah Boulevard would be opened on 5 October 2024, and that the aforementioned flyover and road interchange would be ready by 2028.

== List of interchanges and exits ==
Location	km	mi	Flyover	Exit	Destinations	Notes
Changi	0.0	0.0	Changi	—	ECP	Eastern terminus
Changi	0.8	0.50	Changi	1	Changi South Avenue 3 (westbound); Changi Airport (eastbound)	
Changi	1.7	1.1	Upper Changi	2	TPE; Upper Changi Road North	
Tampines	2.6	1.6	Simei	3A	Simei Road	Signed as exits 3A (westbound) and 3B (eastbound)
Tampines	3.5	2.2	Simei	3B	Tampines Street 31 / Tampines Avenue 2	Signed as exits 3A (westbound) and 3B (eastbound)
Tampines	4.3	2.7	Tampines South	4B	Tampines Avenue 5	
Tampines	4.9	3.0	Tampines South	4A	Simei Avenue	Eastbound exit only
Bedok	6.0	3.7	Bedok Reservoir	6	Bedok North Avenue 3	
Bedok	7.9	4.9	Bedok North	8A	Bedok North Road	Westbound entrance and eastbound exit only
Bedok	8.2	5.1	Bedok North	8B	Bedok Reservoir Road	Westbound entrance and eastbound exit only
Geylang	9.3	5.8	Eunos	9	Jalan Eunos, Eunos Link	
Geylang	11.0	6.8	Paya Lebar	11	Paya Lebar Road	
Kallang	12.7	7.9	Aljunied West	12	KPE; Kallang Bahru, Bendemeer Road	No eastbound exit; eastbound entrance via Aljunied Flyover
Kallang	13.9	8.6	Kallang Way	13	KPE; Kallang Way, Sims Avenue	No westbound exit; westbound entrance via Kallang Flyover
Toa Payoh	14.1	8.8	Whampoa	15A	CTE (towards City)	Signed as exits 15A, 15B (westbound) and 15 (eastbound); access to Central Expressway (CTE) via exit 15B on Whampoa Flyover
Toa Payoh	14.9	9.3	Whampoa	15B	CTE (towards SLE / TPE)	Signed as exits 15A, 15B (westbound) and 15 (eastbound); access to Central Expressway (CTE) via exit 15B on Whampoa Flyover
Toa Payoh	15.3	9.5	Whampoa	15	CTE (towards SLE / TPE); Upper Serangoon Road	Signed as exits 15A, 15B (westbound) and 15 (eastbound); access to Central Expressway (CTE) via exit 15B on Whampoa Flyover
Toa Payoh	15.4	9.6	Kim Keat	16	Lorong 6 Toa Payoh	Signed as exits 16 (westbound) and 16A (eastbound)
Novena	17.2	10.7	Thomson	17	Jalan Datoh, Balestier Road	Signed as exits 17, 17B, 17C (westbound) and 17D (eastbound)
Novena	17.3	10.7	Thomson	17B	Thomson Road	Signed as exits 17, 17B, 17C (westbound) and 17D (eastbound)
Novena	17.6	10.9	Thomson	17C	Upper Thomson Road	Signed as exits 17, 17B, 17C (westbound) and 17D (eastbound)
Novena	17.9	11.1	Thomson	17D	Thomson Road, Toa Payoh	Signed as exits 17, 17B, 17C (westbound) and 17D (eastbound)
Novena	18.5	11.5	—	18	Onraet Road	Eastbound entrance and exit only
Novena	18.9	11.7	Mount Pleasant	19	Whitley Road, Stevens Road	
Bukit Timah	20.2	12.6	Adam	20A	Adam Road	Signed as exits 20A (westbound) and 20B (eastbound)
Bukit Timah	20.9	13.0	Adam	20B	Lornie Road, Lornie Highway	Signed as exits 20A (westbound) and 20B (eastbound)
Bukit Timah	21.6	13.4	Eng Neo	22	Eng Neo Avenue	
Bukit Timah	23.3	14.5	Chantek	24	BKE	Access to southern terminus of Bukit Timah Expressway (BKE)
Bukit Timah	25.0	15.5	Anak Bukit	26A	Dunearn Road, Clementi Road	Signed as exits 26A (westbound) and 26B (eastbound); access to westbound exit via Rifle Range Underpass
Bukit Timah	26.4	16.4	Anak Bukit	26B	Upper Bukit Timah Road	Signed as exits 26A (westbound) and 26B (eastbound); access to westbound exit via Rifle Range Underpass
Clementi	27.3	17.0	Clementi North	27	AYE; Clementi Avenue 6, Toh Tuck Avenue, Bukit Batok East Avenue 3	No eastbound exit
Clementi	28.8	17.9	Toh Tuck	28	AYE; Clementi Avenue 6, Toh Tuck Avenue, Bukit Batok East Avenue 3	No westbound exit
Jurong East	29.4	18.3	Toh Guan	30	Toh Guan Road, Boon Lay Way (westbound); Toh Guan Road (eastbound)	
Jurong East	30.8	19.1	Bukit Batok	31	Bukit Batok Road, Jurong Town Hall Road, Jurong East	
Jurong West	32.2	20.0	—	32	Jurong West Avenue 1, Jurong East Avenue 1 (westbound); Tengah Boulevard (eastbound)	
Jurong West	33.3	20.7	Hong Kah	34	Jurong West Avenue 2, Corporation Road	
Jurong West	34.5	21.4	Tengah	35	KJE	Access to western terminus of Kranji Expressway (KJE)
Jurong West	36.2	22.5	Bahar	36	Jalan Bahar, Kranji	
Jurong West	37.5	23.3	Nanyang	38	Pioneer Road North	
Jurong West	40.0	24.9	Pasir Laba	40	Upper Jurong Road, Singapore Discovery Centre, SAFTI Military Institute (Eastbound); Pasir Laba Camp, Multi-Mission Range Complex (MMRC) (Westbound)	
Pioneer	41.6	25.8	Tuas	41	AYE; Jalan Ahmad Ibrahim	Western terminus; expressway continues as Tuas Road
1.000 mi = 1.609 km; 1.000 km = 0.621 mi: Incomplete access; Route transition
