= West Coast Highway =

West Coast Highway may refer to:

- West Coast Highway, Perth, Western Australia
- West Coast Highway, Singapore
