= Jurong Road =

Former road in western Singapore

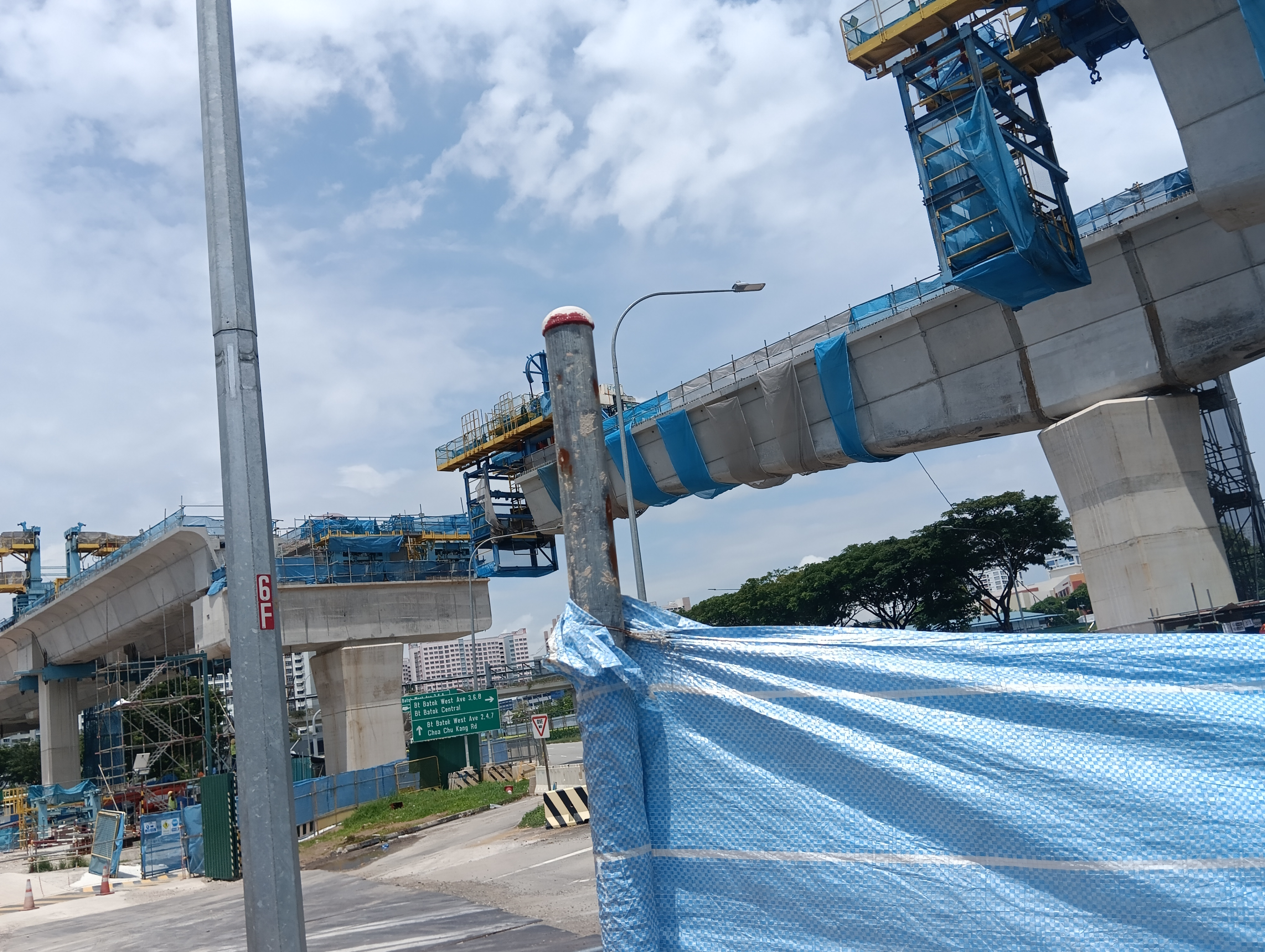
- A photo of Jurong Road's slip road into Bukit Batok Road, taken after the former's closure.

Late 1950s
- Eastern end: Bukit Timah Road
- Western end: Tuas Village

2020
- Eastern end: Bukit Batok Road
- Western end: Jurong West Avenue 2

Location
- Country: Singapore
- Coordinates: 1.3546431°N 103.7269121°E

Highway system
- Transport in Singapore

Jurong Road (Chinese: 裕廊路) was a road in western Singapore. It was the oldest road in Jurong area, having been first constructed between 1852 and 1853 during the early British colonial period to create a proper road link between the rural areas of Jurong and the rest of Singapore.

During its peak, it was a major road spanning between Bukit Timah Road and Tuas Village. However, as more roads were constructed, and as sections of the road were closed or renamed, the road's span was reduced to a small stretch along the PIE near Tengah, before its final closure in 2020.

== Remnants ==
Old Jurong Road

Late 1970s
- Eastern end: Jurong Road (Note: At the point slightly west of the present-day intersection between Jalan Jurong Kechil, Old Jurong Road, and Bukit Batok East Avenue 6)
- Western end: Jurong Road (Note: Situated west of Bukit Batok East Avenue 3, east of Bukit Batok Street 23, and south of Bukit Batok Street 21; see 1984, tile 129)

Present day
- Eastern end: Upper Bukit Timah Road
- Western end: Bukit Batok East Avenue 6

Location
- Country: Singapore
- Coordinates (late 1970s): 1.3476154°N 103.7641636°E
- Coordinates (present day): 1.3474709°N 103.7677450°E

Highway system
- Transport in Singapore

Upper Jurong Road

Early 1960s
- Eastern end: Jurong Road (Note: Near the present-day intersection between Jalan Bahar, Jalan Boon Lay, and Jurong West Avenues 2 and 4.)
- Western end: Tuas Village

Present day
- Eastern end: Boon Lay Way
- Western end: Pasir Laba Flyover (PIE)

Location
- Country: Singapore
- Coordinates: 1.3300363°N 103.6829155°E

Highway system
- Transport in Singapore

The only stretches of road remaining which include "Jurong Road" in their names are Old Jurong Road (Chinese: 旧裕廊路), which runs between the former Bukit Timah Fire Station and Jalan Jurong Kechil, and Upper Jurong Road (Chinese: 裕廊上路), which starts from the western end of Boon Lay Way and ends at Pasir Laba Flyover of the Pan Island Expressway (PIE), after which it continues briefly towards Pasir Laba Camp and the SAF Multi-Mission Range Complex (MMRC).

In addition to these two, Jalan Jurong Kechil's name is "Small Jurong Road" when translated into English, and hence also has "Jurong Road" in its name. The road starts from the intersection of Bukit Batok East Avenue 6 and Old Jurong Road, and ends at Jalan Anak Bukit.

Other remnants of the former road can be found along Bukit Batok East Avenue 6, the PIE, and Jurong West Avenues 2 and 4.

== History ==
Jurong Road was extended by two miles to Sungei Jurong around 1929 at a cost of 11,900 Straits dollars. (Note: Equivalent to 1,388 pounds and 80 pence in 1927 when the tender was given, or £73,262.35 / S$125,217.05 in 2024.)

In the 1950s, Jurong Road spanned from Bukit Timah Road (at the present-day junction between Upper Bukit Timah Road and Jalan Jurong Kechil) to Tuas Village (slightly west of the present-day junction of Tuas Road and Pioneer Road). A bypass road connecting Jurong Road to Bukit Timah Road at the current site of the former Bukit Timah Fire Station was constructed at a cost of $158,000, with its opening announced in March 1959. (Note: 1958, Tile 31; 1961, Tile 31)

The stretch of Jurong Road west of Boon Lay Road (now called Jalan Boon Lay) was renamed to Upper Jurong Road between 1958 and 1961. (Note: 1958, Tile 108; 1978, Tile 108)

The bypass road was later made a part of Jurong Road, and the original stretch of the road which connected to Bukit Timah Road was renamed to Jalan Jurong Kechil between 1963 and 1966. (Note: 1963, Tile 31; 1966, Tile 31)

A five-mile stretch of Jurong Road spanning westwards from Jalan Jurong Kechil was straightened and realigned between 1966 and 1969, but with parts of the original alignment being retained for motorists to use. (Note: 1966, Tile 30; 1969, Tile 30) A stretch of the original alignment from Jalan Jurong Kechil to a point on the present-day Bukit Batok East Avenue 6 was given the name Old Jurong Road sometime between 1975 and 1978. (Note: 1975, Tile 55; 1978, Tile 105) A section of the original alignment from Hillview Avenue (now named Bukit Batok East Avenue 2) closed on 5 July 1985, with the rest of what was then called Old Jurong Road being closed between 1984 and 1988. (Note: 1984, Tile 129; 1988, Tile 177) The stretch of the original alignment between Bukit Batok East Avenue 2 and Jalan Jurong Kechil remains preserved as a park connector in the southern part of Bukit Batok Nature Park.

A stretch of Jurong Road from Jalan Boon Lay to the present-day Bukit Batok Avenue 1 was converted into a stretch of the Pan Island Expressway, with Jurong Road being realigned north from 1978 to make way for the expressway, using parts of the 1966 alignment for the realigned road. (Note: 1966, Tile 108; 1978, Tiles 240-242; 1981, Tiles 240-242; 1984, Tiles 124-128; 1988, Tiles 172-175)

The section of Upper Jurong Road south of Jalan Ahmad Ibrahim (Note: 1978, tile 248) was closed on 14 March 1980. Following this, Upper Jurong Road was straightened and widened between 1984 and 1988. (Note: 1984, Tiles 123-124, 285; 1988 - Tiles 171-172, 321) A portion of the original alignment was retained and named Old Upper Jurong Road, stretching from Jalan Ahmad Ibrahim to a point on the new alignment between Jurong West Streets 72 and 81, but this was closed by 1991. (Note: 1988, Tiles 171-172; 1991, Tiles 193-194)

The stretch of Jurong Road between Jalan Jurong Kechil and Upper Bukit Timah Road was renamed Old Jurong Road between 1988 and 1991. (Note: 1988, Tile 178; 1991, Tile 200)

With the construction of the PIE's extension to Tuas, Jurong Road's 1991 alignment was split by the Hong Kah Flyover in 1993. (Note: 1993, Tile 165; 1995, Tile 165) However, due to the realignment of the PIE as part of the extension, a section of the removed stretch between Corporation Road and Jalan Boon Lay (previously part of Jurong Road) was named Jurong Road, and ran parallel to the split 1991 alignment (Note: 1993, Tile 164; 1995, Tile 164). The former PIE stretch between Jalan Boon Lay and the Hong Kah Flyover was renamed Jurong West Avenue 2 sometime between 1995 and 1998. (Note: 1995, Tile 164; 1998, Tile 192)

These other stretches of Jurong Road were phased out or renamed progressively:

- The section of Jurong Road from Bukit Batok Road to Bukit Batok East Avenue 6 (Note: At a point south of 211 Bukit Batok Street 21, see 1984, Tile 128)) was closed on 10 May 1985. The stretch of the road east of the closed section up till the junction with Jalan Jurong Kechil became part of Bukit Batok East Avenue 6. (Note: 1984, Tiles 128-129; 1988, Tiles 177-178)
- The section of Upper Jurong Road from Pioneer Road North to Jalan Boon Lay was renamed to Jurong West Avenue 4 between 1995 and 1998. (Note: 1995, Tiles 163-164; 1998, Tiles 228-229)
- A stretch of Upper Jurong Road west of Pioneer Road North was closed down on 11 April 1999 and realigned, meaning there was no longer a contiguous road between Upper Jurong Road and the stretch of Jurong Road between Jurong West Avenue 2 and Bukit Batok Road. (Note: 2000, Tiles 227-228; 2007, Tile 152)
- The section of Jurong Road between Jalan Boon Lay and the Hong Kah Flyover was gradually phased out, (Note: 1995, Tiles 164-165; 1998, Tiles 192-193; 2009, Tiles 118-119) and is no longer there.
- The section of Upper Jurong Road west of the Pasir Laba Flyover became a part of the PIE between 1998 and 2000. (Note: 1998, Tiles 263-264; 2000, Tile 263-264)
- The section of Jurong Road around the Tengah area was closed down on 27 September 2020 together with Track 18, Track 20 and Track 22. This will help facilitate the construction of roads - Tengah Way, Tengah Boulevard, and Plantation Loop, as well as neighbouring parks. The last section was also closed down for the construction of Plantation Edge I and II in 2022.

Smaller roads (mostly rural tracks formerly serving several villages (kampongs) scattered in the Tengah and Hong Kah localities) along the stretch of Jurong Road closed in 2020 spread out further into the largely-forested area of Tengah; these include Track 18, Track 20 and Track 22. Track 22 links to Jalan Chichau and Jalan Lam Sam (located along the southern edge of the Choa Chu Kang area).

A short section of the original road (bearing the historic Jurong Road name) connected Jurong West Avenue 2 and Bukit Batok Road, running roughly parallel to the PIE, until the road was permanently closed on 27 September 2020. The Land Transport Authority announced two days later that it would expunge the remaining section of Jurong Road to make way for a new flyover and road interchange linking the PIE, Tengah and Jurong.
