= East Coast Parkway =

Expressway in Singapore

Coordinates: 1.3052°N 103.9212°E

East Coast Parkway
- Lebuhraya Taman Pantai Timur (Malay) 東海岸公園大道 (Chinese) கிழக்கு கடற்கரை விரைவுச்சாலை (Tamil)

Route information
- Length: 16 km (9.9 mi)
- Existed: 1970s–present
- History: Completed in 1981

Major junctions
- West end: Sheares Avenue
- NSC (future), KPE, MCE, PIE
- East end: Singapore Changi Airport

Location
- Country: Singapore
- Regions: Marina Bay, Kallang, Marine Parade, Changi South, Singapore Changi Airport, Bedok, Tampines

Highway system
- Expressways of Singapore

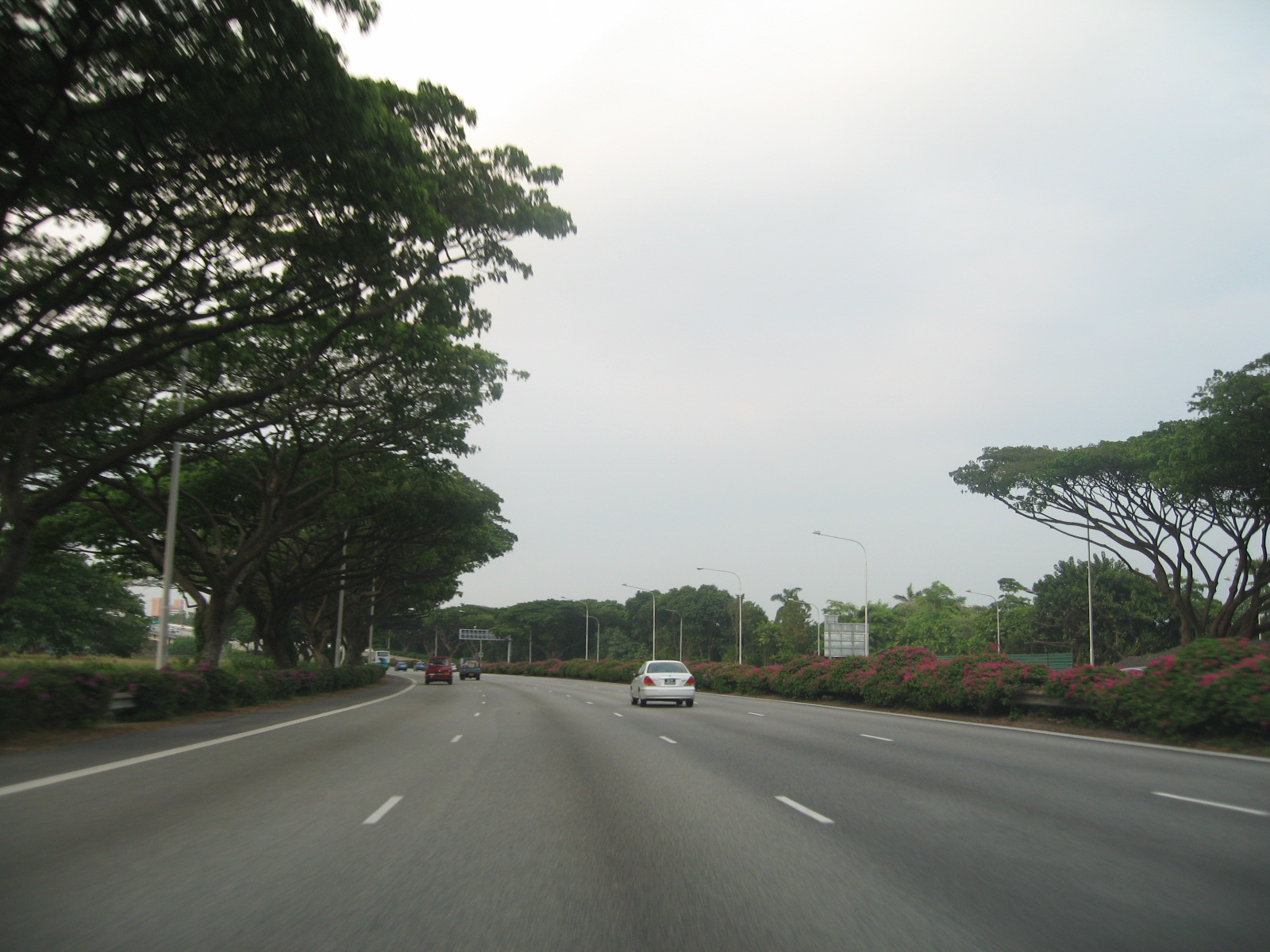
Former section of East Coast Parkway eastbound towards Singapore Changi Airport, before Benjamin Sheares Bridge (current Sheares Avenue)

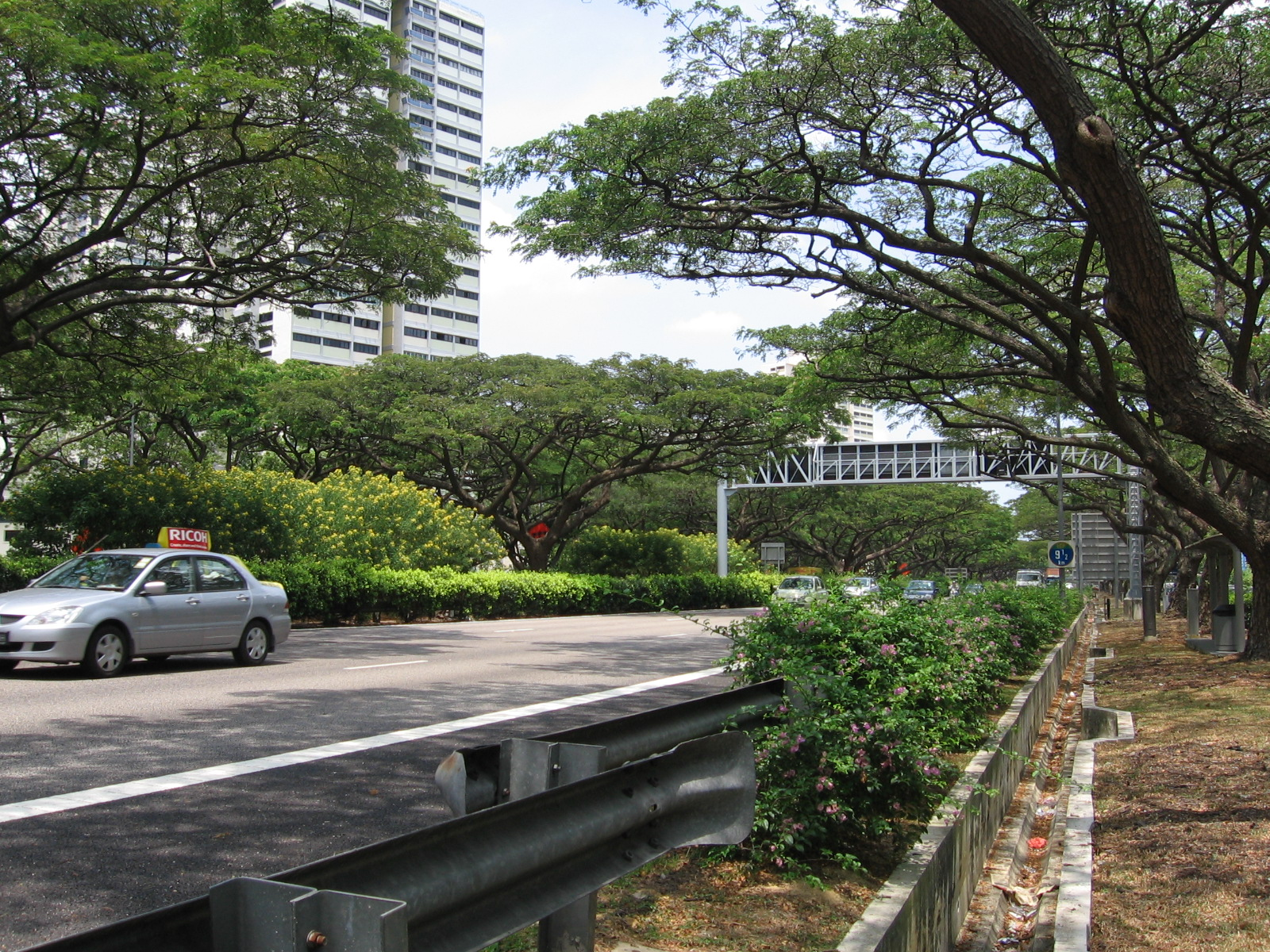
East Coast Parkway westbound towards the downtown

The East Coast Parkway (Abbreviation: ECP) is a fully-controlled access expressway that runs along the southeastern coast of Singapore. It is approximately 16 kilometres (9.9 mi) in length. As of July 2022, it is Singapore's third-longest expressway. The expressway serves a vital function by being the primary highway from the airport to the central area.

The ECP connects Changi Airport in the east through the Benjamin Sheares Bridge to the Marina Bay and Central Business District areas in the south.

The ECP connects to three other expressways, the Marina Coastal Expressway (MCE) and the Kallang-Paya Lebar Expressway (KPE) at the 14 kilometre mark, and to the Pan Island Expressway at the Changi Flyover, about 1 kilometre (0.62 mi) from the end of the expressway. The ECP will also connect to the future North–South Corridor near the 15 kilometre mark.

Unlike other expressways in Singapore whose abbreviation ends with 'E' for 'Expressway', the East Coast Parkway abbreviation ends with 'P' instead.

The East Coast Parkway used to be directly connected to the AYE. However, with the opening of the MCE on 29 December 2013, a section of expressway after the Benjamin Sheares Bridge was truncated and another section at the Marina South area realigned and converted into an arterial road.

The expressway, together with the MCE and the AYE could be interpreted as the southern east-west road in Singapore.

The expressway first heads southeast from Changi Airport before curving to follow the coastline after Xilin Avenue. It then follows East Coast Park past Upper East Coast, Siglap, Marine Parade and Mountbatten areas. After Exit 13 for Fort Road (signed 14A eastbound), the ECP curves further inland passing through the interchange with the MCE and KPE before the Benjamin Sheares Bridge which offers a beautiful view of the downtown. The highway (still on the bridge) curves south and into the Marina Bay Area, passing Marina Bay Sands.

The ECP then ends near the 16-kilometre mark and merges with Sheares Avenue (newly formed as part of the truncated section of the former route). From Sheares Avenue, a left turn goes to Marina Boulevard towards Gardens by the Bay and the Marina Bay Cruise Centre, or a right turn enters Central Boulevard that heads towards the Downtown Core and Chinatown.

== History ==
Plans for the coastal highway to reduce congestion at Golden Mile started on 30 July 1969. Detailed plans were put in place to create interchanges at Nicoll Highway, Bras Basah Road and Stamford Road. On 3 September 1970, a $35 million plan was put in place to reclaim more land off of Bedok, with the final phase starting on 7 October 1970. On 18 December 1970, the government decided to reclaim more than 125 acres of land.

On 24 May 1973, the government proceeded to build a $300 million highway across the harbour to the breakwater line outside Clifford Pier to ease peak hour congestion at the Collyer Quay area. The plans involved the reclamation of land off Nicoll Highway and the breakwater at Clifford Pier. Reclamation was expected to begin in six to nine months. The 280m long bridge was to be built at a height of 30 ft above high water level to allow ample headroom for ferries to use the channel. The new highway would turn landwards to South Quay and then to the vacant piece of land past the Singapore Polytechnic, before turning towards Anson Road. To provide space for construction work, the government acquired the former Singapore Polytechnic site in 1975, with the polytechnic shifting to Dover. Plans were made on 16 January 1974 to extend Siglap Road to the expressway. On 28 February 1974, the government also acquired two portions of land, for the extension of Bedok South Avenue 1 from Upper East Coast Road to the ECP.

On 12 June 1974, tenders were invited for the construction of the super-highway which would link the east coast of Singapore to the city. The extension of East Coast Parkway was to run from Tanjong Rhu via the Kallang River to Marina Centre. Between the two crossings, the expressway would be connected to an interchange formed by a one-way pair of roads running on the reclaimed Marina Centre, connecting Ophir and Rochor Roads at Beach Road. It would take traffic to Orchard, Chinatown and Little India. It would also run through the reclaimed land in front of Shenton Way and Raffles Quay, before going to the Telok Ayer Basin at South Quay, where it would connect to the one-way pair of roads at Prince Edward Road and Maxwell Road. It was planned to run on the elevated structure across the former Singapore Polytechnic at Shenton Way. A separate project was planned to even extend the expressway to Keppel Road, before going towards the Jurong Expressway (to be known as Ayer Rajah Expressway).

On 24 April 1975, five international firms were invited to the tender of the construction of East Coast Parkway, leading to the construction of Benjamin Sheares Bridge, named after the then President of Singapore, Benjamin Sheares. The expressway would also be linked to Ophir/Rochor Road, which would be built together with the flyover. The first phase would cover the portion from Tanjong Rhu Flyover to South Quay, while another section would lead from South Quay to Shenton Way.

Construction of the first phase of the East Coast Parkway from Fort Road to Marine Parade started in 1971 and was completed in December 1975. It was followed by an extension of Phase 2 which was completed in November 1975 to Bedok South Road and then Phase 3 was built together with Changi Airport in 1980. Construction of Phase 3 began in May 1976, with two interchanges at Xilin Avenue and the Pan Island Expressway. It was expected to be completed by 1978. They were built on reclaimed land by the former Public Works Department.

Construction of Phase 4, stretching from Fort Road to Keppel Road began in 1977 and was opened on 18 April 1981 to Ophir Road, and on 26 September 1981 towards Keppel Road. The government had decided to further reclaim the Marina South area, linking Tanjong Rhu and Telok Ayer Basin.

Traffic lights remained on the expressway until the completion of the last flyover at Fort Road in 1989. The opening of ECP relieved the traffic load of the city area in the 1980s. Traffic volume at Nicoll Highway decreased by 20 per cent, which would otherwise worsen with the implemented ERP gantries. Robinson Road and Cecil Street were better managed with lesser traffic jams with the declining load all the way to 1990s.

Flanked by East Coast Park on one side and high-rise housing on the other, the well-landscaped expressway was built and maintained with the conscious intention of giving visitors arriving via Singapore Changi Airport a good first impression of the country as they commute from the airport to the city centre.

Traffic congestion during the morning peak hours, however, led to the introduction of an Electronic Road Pricing (ERP) gantry near the Tanjong Rhu Flyover in the direction towards the city, one of the first two gantries to be set up in the country, which came into operation on 1 April 1998 together with the other gantry at Ophir Road. The ERP gantry price was increased to $6 in 2013 and reduced significantly when the MCE opened but decommissioned on 6 April 2020.

A decommissioned emergency highway strip was built in the long, straight section of the ECP close to Changi Airport. This section can be easily identified by removable potted plants instead of the standard large trees on the median strip. However, the highway strip has never been used for emergency landing purposes.

To facilitate the development of the new downtown, the ECP was truncated after the Benjamin Sheares Bridge, with the stretch at Marina South area realigned and converted to a major arterial road called Sheares Avenue. In the westbound direction, a new expressway called the Marina Coastal Expressway, was built to connect the ECP to the Ayer Rajah Expressway.

== List of interchanges and exits ==
Location	km	mi	Flyover	Exit	Destinations	Notes
Changi	0.4	0.25	—	—	Airport Boulevard	Eastern terminus, continues towards Changi Airport
Changi	1	0.62	Changi	1	PIE (towards Tuas)	Access to TPE (towards SLE) via PIE exit 2
Tampines	2.4	1.5	Tanah Merah	2A	Tanah Merah Coast Road; Changi Coast Road; Changi Village	
Tampines	2.8	1.7	Tanah Merah	2B	Xilin Avenue; Tampines	Eastbound exit and westbound entrance only
Tampines	3.4	2.1	—	—	East Coast Park Carpark H East Coast Park Service Road	Westbound exit and entrance only
Bedok	5.5	3.4	—	—	East Coast Park Carpark F3; East Coast Park Service Road	Westbound exit and entrance only
Bedok	6.5	4.0	—	6	Bayshore Road	Eastbound exit and entrance only
Bedok	6.6	4.1	—	—	East Coast Park Service Road	Eastbound entrance only No exit ramp
Bedok	7	4.3	Laguna	7A	East Coast Park Service Road	Both bounds exit only No entry ramp
Bedok	7.3	4.5	Laguna	7B	Bedok South Avenue 1 Bedok	
Bedok	8	5.0	—	8A	Siglap Road; Siglap Link	Eastbound exit and entrance only
Bedok	8.8	5.5	—	8B	Marine Vista	Eastbound exit and entrance only
Marine Parade	10	6.2	Marine Parade	10A	East Coast Park Service Road	Both bounds exit and westbound entrance only
Marine Parade	10.1	6.3	Marine Parade	11	Marine Parade; Still Road South	
Marine Parade	11.5	7.1	Tanjong Katong	11	Tanjong Katong Road	No westbound exit
Marine Parade	12	7.5	—	—	East Coast Park Service Road	Westbound exit only No entry ramp
Marine Parade	12.6	7.8	Tanjong Rhu	13	Fort Road	Access via westbound exit and eastbound entrance only Signed as Exit 14A in eastbound direction
Marine Parade	13.6	8.5	—	14B	MCE (towards AYE)	Westbound exit and eastbound entrance only
Kallang	14.2	8.8	Tanjong Rhu	14A	Fort Road	Access via westbound exit and eastbound entrance only Signed as Exit 13 in westbound direction
Kallang	14.3	8.9	—	14	KPE (towards TPE)	Access via westbound exit and eastbound entrance only Signed as Exit 13 in westbound direction
Downtown Core	14.6	9.1	Start of Benjamin Sheares Bridge			
Downtown Core	15.6	9.7	Benjamin Sheares	15	Rochor Road	
Downtown Core	16.1	10.0	—	—	Sheares Avenue	Western terminus, continues as Sheares Avenue
1.000 mi = 1.609 km; 1.000 km = 0.621 mi: Incomplete access; Route transition

== See also ==
- Marina Coastal Expressway
- Ayer Rajah Expressway
- Pan Island Expressway
