= Jurong Town Hall Road =

Road in Jurong East, Singapore

Coordinates: 1°19′51.89″N 103°44′27.96″E

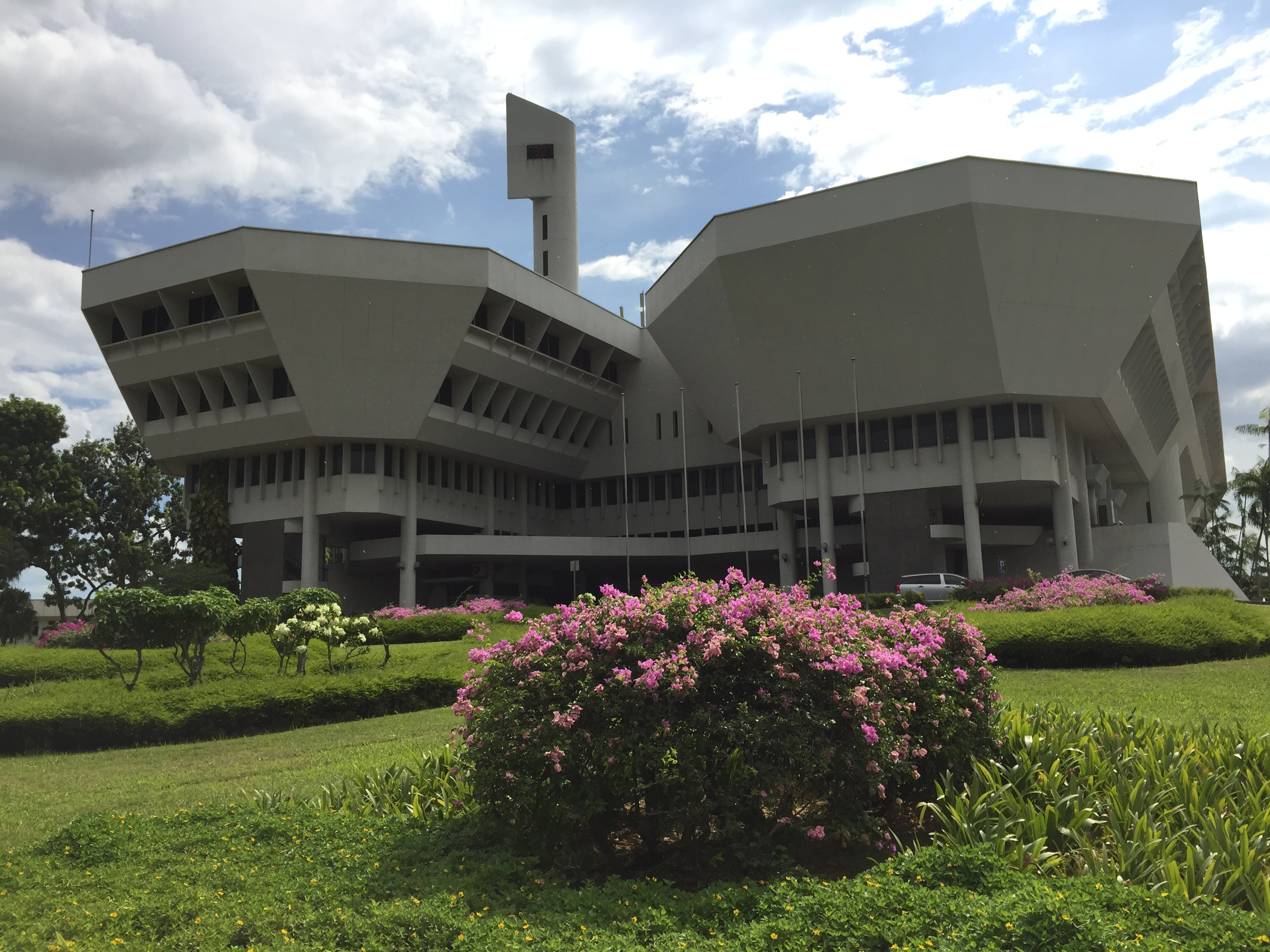
Jurong Town Hall at 9 Jurong Town Hall Road. The road was named after this building.

Jurong Town Hall Road (Chinese: 裕廊镇大会堂路) is a road in Jurong East, Singapore that connects the Pan Island Expressway and West Coast Road.

It was built in 1969 through Jalan Bahru Selatan so that bus route 143 could connect to the Jurong Road 10-milestone market. It was named after the Jurong Town Hall, built between May 1971 and March 1974 as the headquarters for the Jurong Town Corporation (now JTC Corporation) which had been formed in June 1968 to develop and manage industrial estates in Jurong.

Currently, Jurong Town Hall (also known as Trade Association Hub) and the headquarters of JTC Corporation, The JTC Summit, have addresses of Jurong Town Hall Road. Jurong East MRT station, Jurong Regional Library, Former JCube (Now known as J'Den Residences) and the Science Centre are nearby.

== Gallery ==
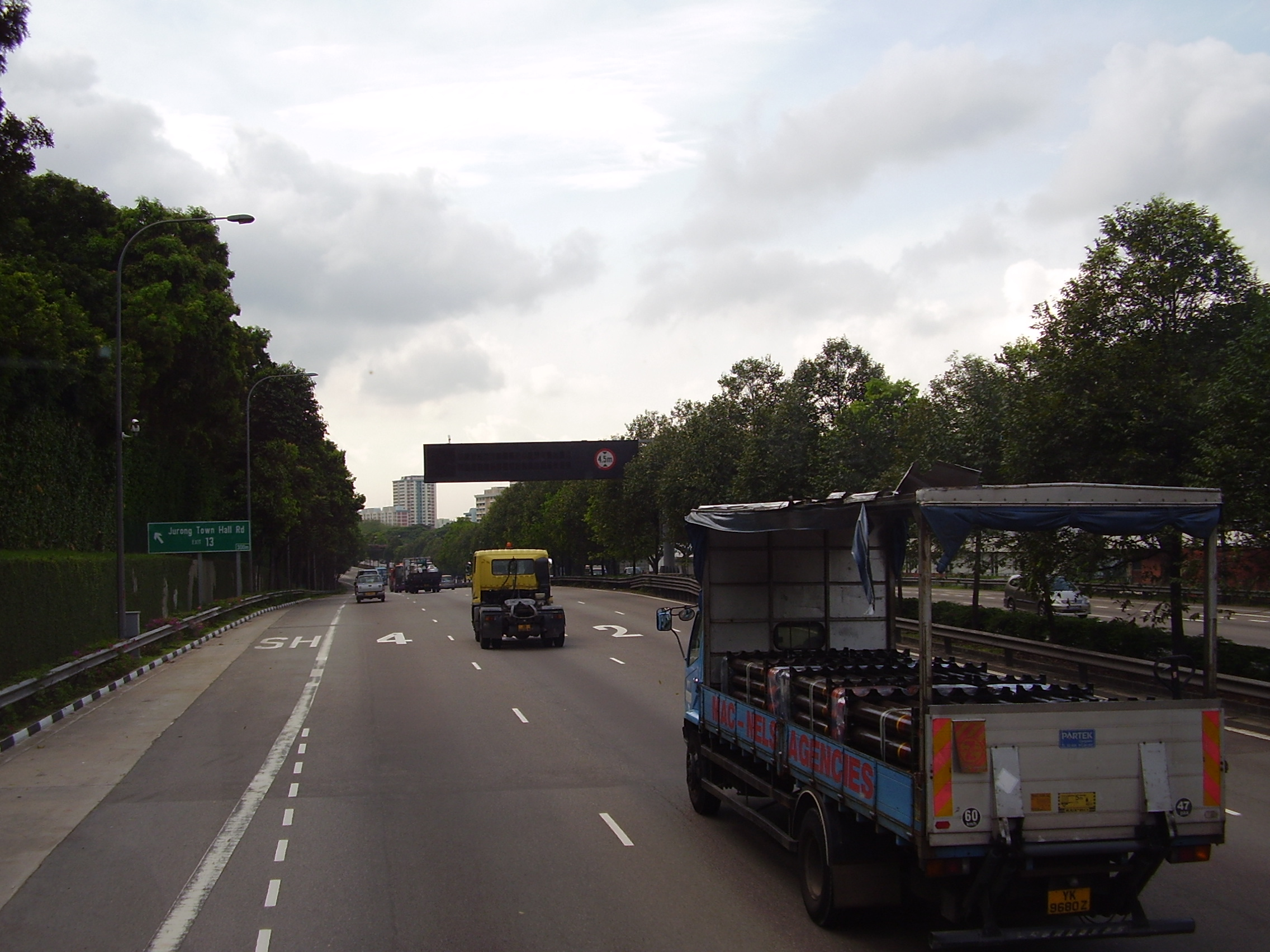
Ayer Rajah Expressway before Jurong Town Hall Road

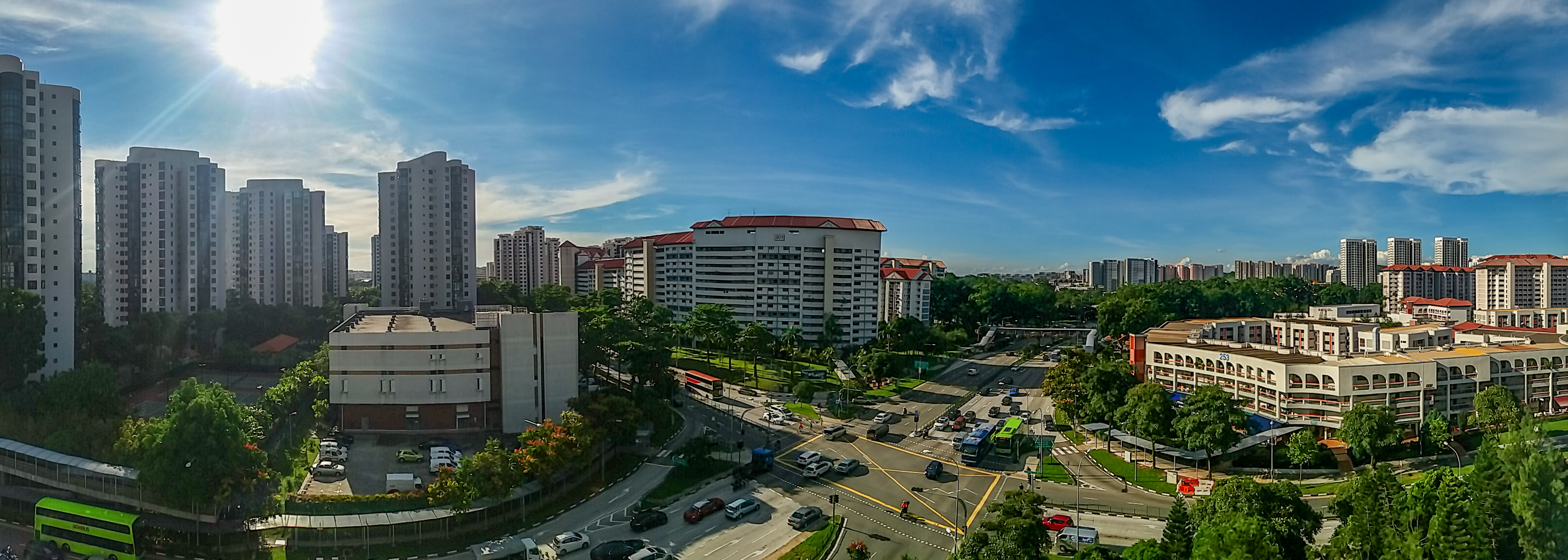
