= Ayer Rajah Expressway =

Expressway in Singapore

Coordinates: 1.3222918°N 103.7502573°E

Ayer Rajah Expressway
- Lebuhraya Ayer Rajah (Malay) 亞逸拉惹高速公路 (Chinese) ஆயர் ராஜா விரவுச்சாலை (Tamil)

Route information
- Part of AH143
- Length: 26.5 km (16.5 mi)
- Existed: 1983–present
- History: First section completed in 1988, last section completed in 1998

Major junctions
- West end: Tuas Checkpoint (Tuas Second Link)
- PIE, ORRS (Portsdown Avenue), CTE
- East end: Keppel (MCE)

Location
- Country: Singapore
- Regions: Tuas, Jurong, Clementi, West Coast, Bukit Merah

Highway system
- Expressways of Singapore

The Ayer Rajah Expressway (Note: IPA: /ˈɑː(j)eɪ ˌrɑːdʒɑː, ˈɑː(j)ɛər -/ AH-yay RAH-jah or AH-yair-) (AYE) extends from the western end of the Marina Coastal Expressway (MCE) in the south of Singapore to Tuas in the west near the Tuas Second Link to Malaysia. Together with the MCE and the East Coast Parkway (ECP), it forms a second east-west link to complement the role played by the Pan Island Expressway (PIE).

== History ==
Construction on the expressway commenced in 1983, with the first two phases completed by 1988. This section involved the widening of several existing roads along the way, such as Ayer Rajah Road and Upper Ayer Rajah Road, as well as the construction of what was then the longest road viaduct, the Keppel Viaduct, from where the eastern end of the expressway commences. The road extends from Alexandra Road until Keppel Road. It ends at Teban Flyover along Jurong Town Hall Road.

With the construction beginning from 5 December 1993, the existing Jalan Ahmad Ibrahim from Tuas West Drive to Jurong Town Hall Road was widened and merged into Ayer Rajah Expressway which was opened on 18 November 1997. The expressway was extended to Tuas from Teban Flyover in conjunction with the opening of the Tuas Second Link to Johor on 2 January 1998. This construction, which followed the alignment of Jalan Ahmad Ibrahim, involved the expansion of the existing road to match with the width of the rest of the AYE, construction of "filter" roads on both sides of the expressway (which eventually took the name of Jalan Ahmad Ibrahim), and the building of five flyovers and two underpasses. It meets up with the PIE at the Tuas Flyover.

The eastern terminus of the AYE used to continue onto the western terminus of the East Coast Parkway (ECP). After the MCE was opened on 29 December 2013, the ECP was truncated and the MCE had taken over parts of the route, which connects AYE to the Kallang–Paya Lebar Expressway (KPE) and ECP.

== Proposed realignment ==
During the 2014 Singapore National Day rally, Prime Minister Lee Hsien Loong spoke of the possibility of realigning the stretch of the AYE near Jurong Lake Gardens south to allow for more space to build housing in the area. Government agencies later further explained that such a move would "integrate the Pandan Reservoir area with Jurong Lake District to form a larger and more cohesive development area".

National Development Minister Desmond Lee gave an update on this proposed realignment on 30 June 2024, sharing that "agencies are currently studying various options, including how we can make it easier for residents to move between Teban Gardens and Jurong Lake District", with more information to be made available when ready.

== Gallery ==
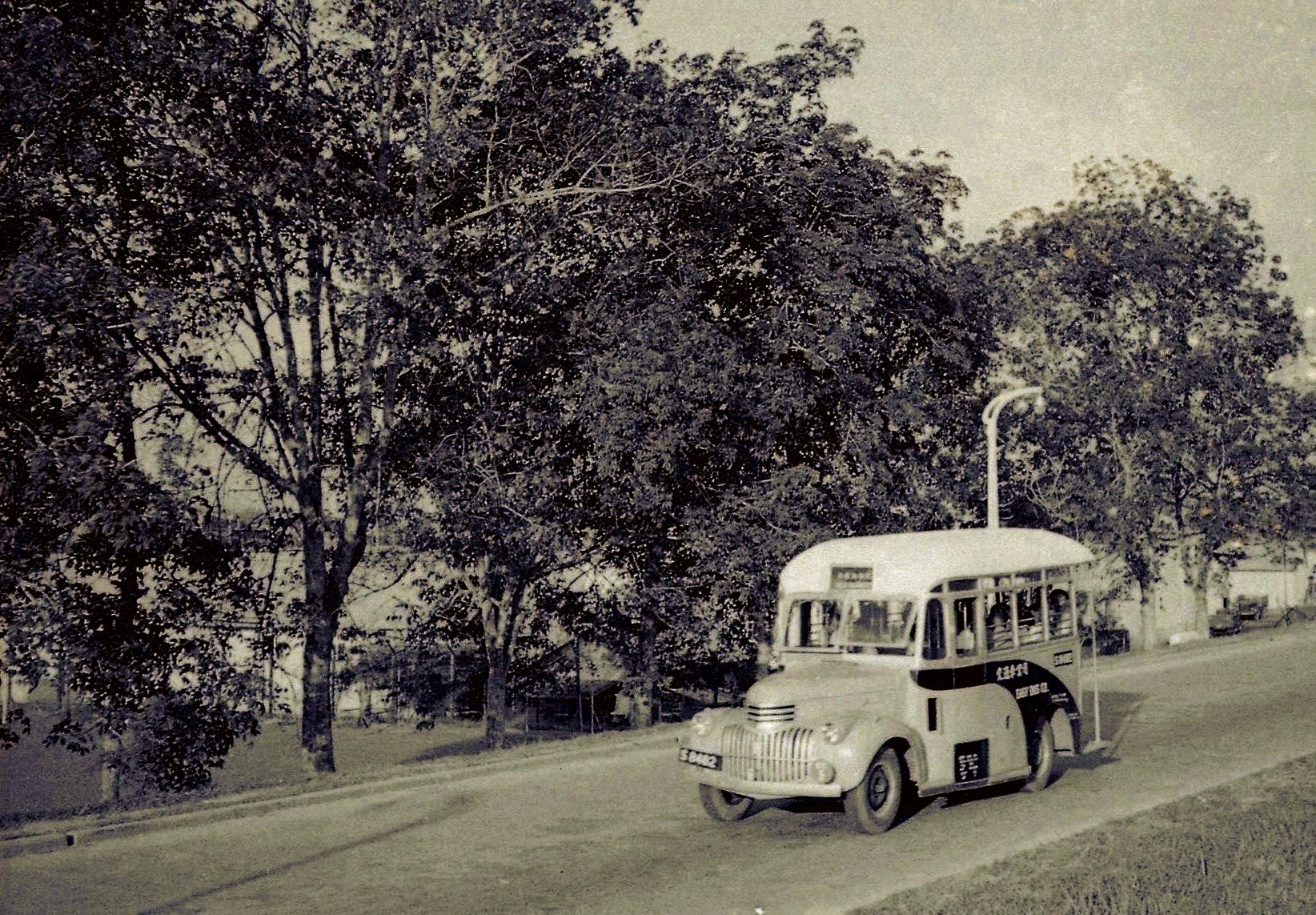
Local bus heading west on Ayer Rajah Rd - 1945

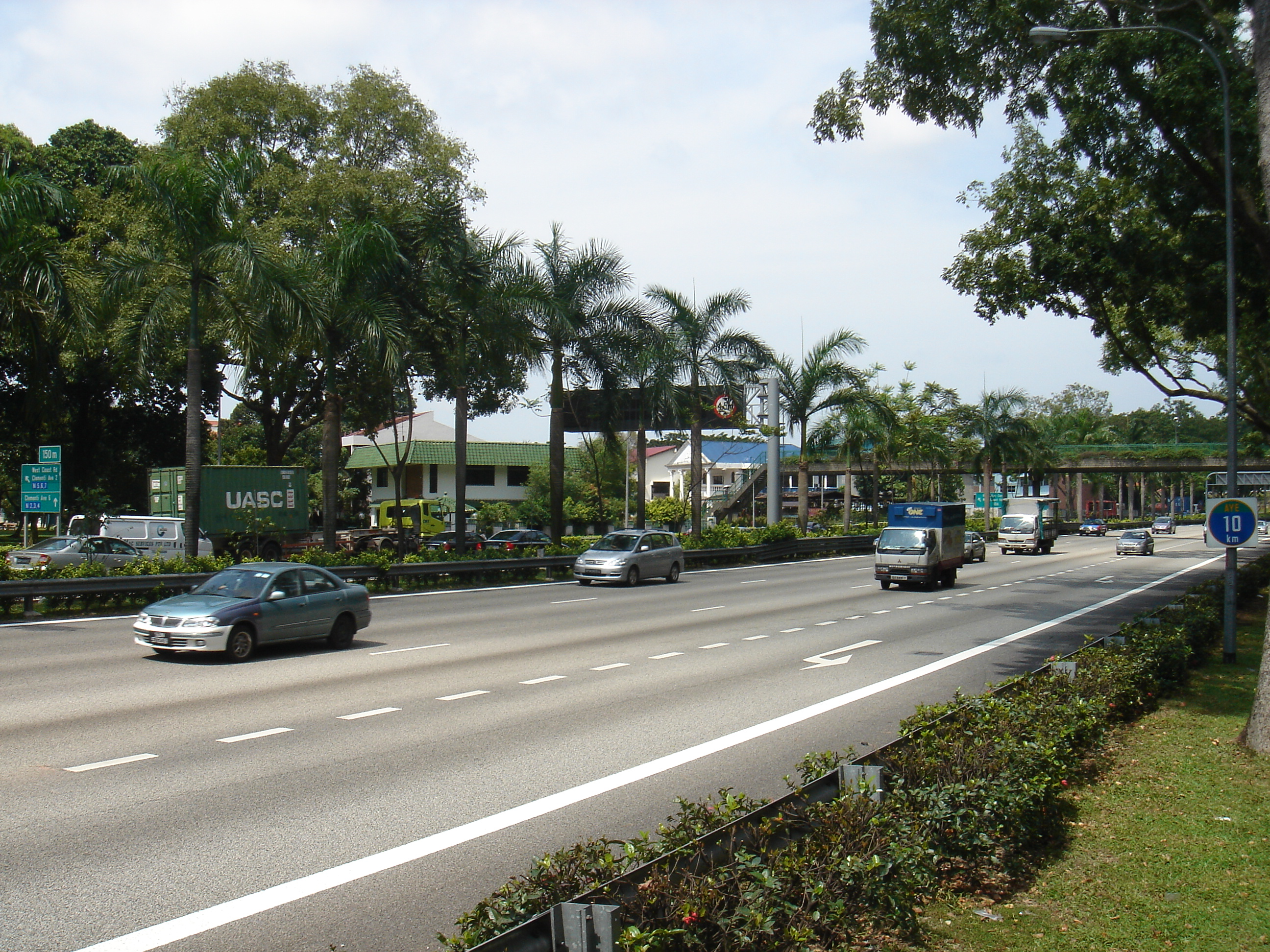
The Clementi section of the Ayer Rajah Expressway

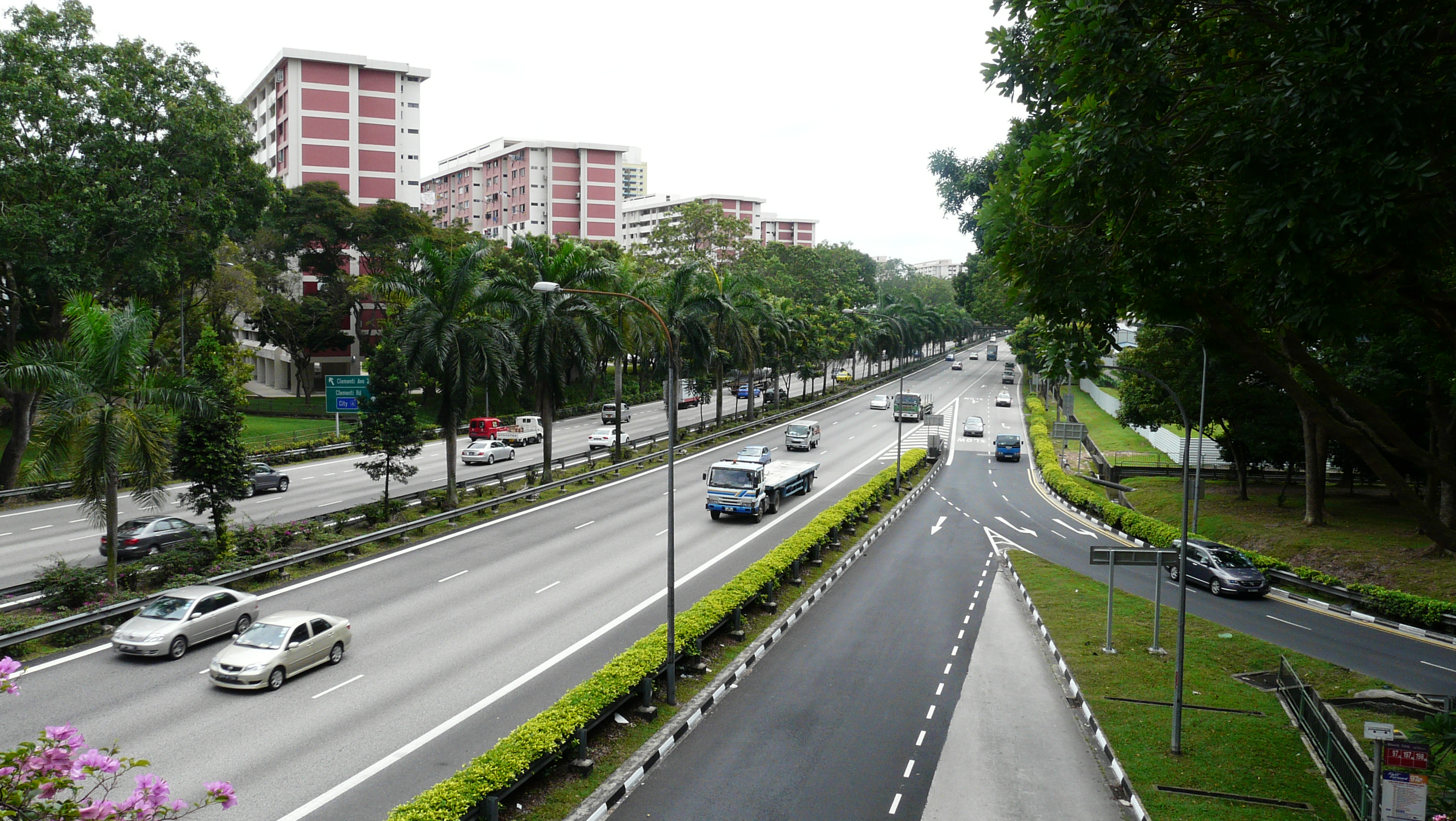
Another view

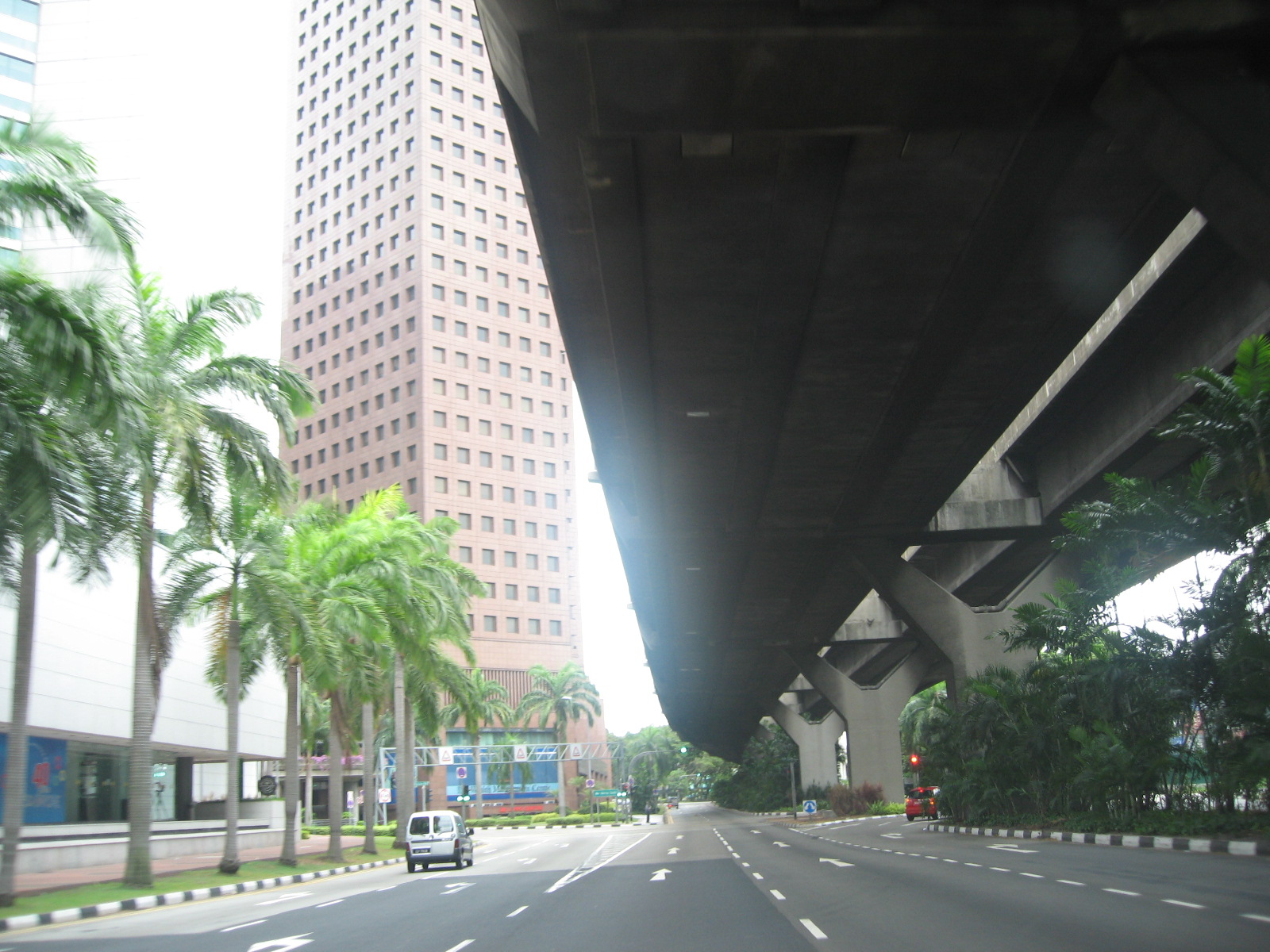
Keppel Road

A video taken from a car travelling west in the direction of Tuas, and exiting at Exit 9 (Clementi Road)

== List of interchanges and exits ==
Location	km	mi	Flyover	Exit	Destinations	Notes
Outram	0.0	0.0	Keppel Viaduct	—	MCE (towards ECP/KPE)	Eastern terminus, expressway continues as MCE
Outram	0.0	0.0	Keppel Viaduct	1A	Keppel Road	Westbound exit and eastbound entrance only
Bukit Merah	1.7	1.1	Keppel Viaduct	2A	West Coast Highway; Telok Blangah Road	Westbound exit and entrance only
Bukit Merah	2.3	1.4	Keppel Viaduct	2B	Keppel Road	Eastbound exit only
Bukit Merah	2.9	1.8	Radin Mas Flyover	2C	CTE (towards SLE)	Eastbound exit and westbound entrance only
Bukit Merah	3	1.9	Lower Delta Flyover	3	Lower Delta Road; Jalan Bukit Merah; Telok Blangah Road	Eastbound exit and westbound entrance only
Queenstown	6	3.7	Gillman Flyover	6	Alexandra Road	Eastbound exit and westbound entrance only
Queenstown	6.5	4.0	Portsdown Flyover	7A	Normanton Park; Science Park Drive; Portsdown Avenue one-north Avenue; Queensway	
Queenstown	7.1	4.4	Portsdown Flyover	7B	Normanton Park; Science Park Drive; Portsdown Avenue one-north Avenue; Queensway	
Queenstown	7.7	4.8	Buona Vista Flyover	8	South Buona Vista Road; North Buona Vista Road	
Queenstown	9.7	6.0	University Flyover	9	Clementi Road	
Clementi	10.3	6.4	Clementi Flyover	10A	Clementi Avenue 2 (southbound); West Coast Road	Westbound exit and entrance only
Clementi	10.7	6.6	Clementi Flyover	10B	Clementi Avenue 2 (northbound)	Eastbound exit and entrance only
Clementi	11.4	7.1	Pandan Flyover	11	Clementi Avenue 6 PIE (both bounds); West Coast Way	Access to West Coast Way from only westbound exit
Jurong East	13.4	8.3	Teban Flyover	13	Jurong Town Hall Road	
Jurong East	14.4	8.9	—	14	Jalan Ahmad Ibrahim; Penjuru Road	Westbound exit and entrance only
Jurong East	15.6	9.7	Corporation Flyover	15A	Jalan Terusan; Corporation Road; Jurong Port Road	Westbound exit and entrance only
Jurong West	16.1	10.0	—	15B	Yuan Ching Road	Eastbound exit and entrance only
Boon Lay	16.8	10.4	—	17	Jalan Boon Lay; Jurong Pier Road; Jurong Island	Access via Westbound exit
Boon Lay	18.2	11.3	Jurong Hill Flyover	17	Jurong Pier Road; Jalan Boon Lay; Jurong Port Road; Corporation Road	Access via Eastbound exit
Boon Lay	18.6	11.6	Pioneer Flyover	18	Pioneer Road North; Pioneer Road; Benoi Sector	Access via Westbound exit
Pioneer	19.7	12.2	Pioneer Flyover	18	First Lok Yang Road; Pioneer Road; Pioneer Road North	Access via Eastbound exit
Pioneer	20.4	12.7	Benoi Flyover	20	Benoi Road; Gul Way	Access via Westbound exit
Pioneer	21.5	13.4	Benoi Flyover	20	Benoi Road	Access via Eastbound exit
Pioneer	22.2	13.8	Tuas Flyover	22	PIE (towards Changi); Tuas Road; Tuas Port	Access via Westbound exit
Tuas	23.4	14.5	Tuas Flyover	22	PIE (towards Changi); Jalan Ahmad Ibrahim	Access via Eastbound exit
Tuas	24	15	Tuas West Underpass	24	Tuas Avenue 8 Tuas West Road	Access via Westbound exit
Tuas	25.7	16.0	Tuas West Underpass	26A	Tuas West Road	Access via Eastbound exit
Tuas	26.7	16.6	Tuas Checkpoint Viaduct	—	Second Link	Western terminus, expressway continues as Second Link via Tuas Checkpoint
1.000 mi = 1.609 km; 1.000 km = 0.621 mi: Incomplete access; Route transition

== See also ==
- East Coast Parkway
