= Outer Ring Road System =

Road network in Singapore

Route information
- Length: 19 km (12 mi)
- History: Introduced in 1994

Major junctions
- West end: Ayer Rajah (AYE)
- AYE, PIE, NSC, CTE, KPE
- East end: Tampines

Location
- Country: Singapore

Highway system
- Expressways of Singapore

The Outer Ring Road System, or more commonly known as ORRS, is a network of major arterial roads in Singapore that forms a 19km ring road through the towns along the city fringe. The ORRS is a semi-expressway, just like the West Coast Highway. Since 1994, roads along the ORRS have been upgraded in stages to provide a smoother route to travel across the island. Roads and interchanges along the ORRS are constantly being upgraded to cater to the ever increasing traffic demand. It starts as Portsdown Avenue in Queenstown and ends as Tampines Avenue 10 in Tampines. The series of roads passes through the areas of Queenstown, Bukit Timah, Central Catchment Nature Reserve, Bishan, Toa Payoh, Geylang and Tampines.

== Route ==
The route of the ORRS forms a semi-circle shape, connecting several expressways and major arterial roads. Travelling from west to east in a clockwise direction, the route begins at Queenstown with a connection to the Ayer Rajah Expressway. The route continues northward through the residential areas of Bukit Timah via Farrer Road and Adam Road, with the first connection to the Pan Island Expressway. The route continues east through Bukit Brown, Toa Payoh, Bishan and Bartley, via the MacRitchie Viaduct and Lornie Viaduct and a connection to the Central Expressway. From here, the route travels eastwards to Kaki Bukit and Tampines through a series of viaducts.

== Benefit ==
With the ORRS, traffic volume on city-bound roads will be reduced. It also provides an alternative route east–west travel for motorists without going through the city. Since ORRS is extensively linked to expressways and other arterial roads, such as Bukit Timah Road, motorists can get from one traffic route to another easily.

== Upgrading projects ==
The first upgrading project started in 1994, with two intersections along Farrer Road being the first to be upgraded. The upgrading projects had to be carried out in stages to minimise disruption to traffic. The completion of the Portsdown Flyover, Queensway Flyover and Queensway Underpass marks another milestone in the realisation of the ORRS. The Farrer Road section of the upgrading project completed in 2009.

== Interchange along ORRS ==
As of June 2025, the route is almost entirely grade-separated, with the exception of remaining 4 intersections, that are controlled by traffic signals.

Road name	Interchange with ^{1}	Type	Remarks	Name of interchange
Portsdown Avenue	Ayer Rajah Expressway	Diamond	Start of ORRS going eastbound; end of ORRS going westbound.	Portsdown Flyover
Portsdown Avenue	one-north Avenue	Seagull	On and off ramps are present from one-north Avenue to Portsdown Avenue and vice versa. The right turn off-ramp is headed for AYE (City).	one-north Flyover
Portsdown Avenue	Queensway	3-way	From Portsdown Avenue, it goes straight towards Queensway northbound and the ORRS continues from there.	Queensway Flyover
Queensway	Commonwealth Drive	LILO	-	-
Queensway	Commonwealth Avenue	SPUI	Queensway Underpass offers a non-stop drive through this interchange.	Queensway Underpass
Queensway	Stirling Drive	LILO	This intersection is only accessible via at-grade Queensway.	-
Queensway	Margaret Drive	LILO	This intersection is only accessible via at-grade Queensway.	-
Queensway	Commonwealth Drive	LILO		-
Farrer Road	Holland Road	Three-level diamond	To go from Queensway to Farrer Road, one can drive through the Farrer Underpass.	Farrer Underpass, Holland Flyover
Farrer Road	Leedon Heights	LILO	-	-
Farrer Road	Farrer Drive	LILO	-	-
Farrer Road	Empress Road	3-way	-	-
Farrer Road	Woollerton Park	LILO	-	-
Farrer Road	Bukit Timah Road	Three-level diamond	Bukit Timah Road travels westward only, access the Farrer Flyover to stay on the ORRS.	Farrer Flyover, Bukit Timah Underpass
Adam Road	Dunearn Road	Three-level diamond	Dunearn Road travels east bound only, access the Farrer Flyover to stay on the ORRS.	Farrer Flyover, Dunearn Underpass
Adam Road	Dunearn Circle	LILO	-	-
Adam Road	Chee Hoon Avenue	LILO	-	-
Adam Road	Camden Park	LILO	-	-
Adam Road	Adam Park	LILO	-	-
Adam Road	Pan Island Expressway (PIE)	Parclo	-	Adam Flyover
Lornie Highway	Lornie Road	Slip lane	To go from Adam Road to Lornie Highway, one can drive on Adam Flyover. An alternative road is Lornie Road, which is parallel to Lornie Highway, although Lornie Road has a longer distance than Lornie Highway.	Adam Flyover
Thomson Road			To go from Lornie Highway to Braddell Road, one can drive on MacRitchie Viaduct.	Marymount Flyover, MacRitchie Viaduct, Lornie Viaduct
Braddell Road	Bishan Road	Seagull	Bishan Flyover offers a non-stop drive through this interchange.	Bishan Flyover
Braddell Road	Lorong 6 Toa Payoh	Trumpet	–	Toa Payoh North Flyover
Braddell Road	Bishan Street 11	LILO	Can only be accessed by traffic travelling eastbound.	–
Braddell Road	Lorong 8 Toa Payoh	Slip lane	Lorong 8 Toa Payoh only allows traffic to travel westbound only. Vehicles are not permitted to leave the ORRS here.	–
Braddell Road	Central Expressway, Lorong Chuan	3-level SPUI	Braddell Underpass offers a non-stop drive through this interchange.	Braddell Underpass, Braddell Flyover
Braddell Road	Upper Serangoon Road	Three-level diamond	To go from Braddell Road to Bartley Road, one can drive through Bartley Underpass. This interchange is Singapore's first four-tier interchange, with, from highest to lowest, Upper Serangoon Viaduct, Upper Serangoon Road, Bartley Underpass and North East line tunnel.	Woodleigh Underpass, Upper Serangoon Viaduct
Bartley Road	Serangoon Avenue 1	4-way	–	–
Bartley Road	Upper Paya Lebar Road	3-level SPUI	Only motorists travelling eastbound can only enter and exit to Upper Paya Lebar Road.	
Bartley Road East	Hougang Avenue 3	SPUI		Bartley Viaduct
Bartley Road East	Airport Road	SPUI	Only motorists travelling westbound can only enter and exit to Airport Road.	Bartley Viaduct
Bartley Road East	KPE	SPUI	Only motorists travelling westbound can only enter and exit to Airport Road.	Bartley Viaduct
Bartley Road East	Kaki Bukit Ave 4	LILO	-	-
Bartley Road East	Bedok North Road	Seagull	To go from Bartley Road East to Tampines Avenue 10, one can drive on Kaki Bukit Viaduct.	Kaki Bukit Viaduct
Tampines Avenue 10	Tampines Avenue 1	Box, Seagull	Start of ORRS leading westbound; end of ORRS leading eastbound.	–

^Note 1: Only expressways, arterial roads and major roads will be mentioned. Minor roads will not be mentioned.

== See also ==
- Expressways of Singapore
- West Coast Highway, Singapore
- Nicoll Highway
