= Benjamin Sheares Bridge =

Bridge in Singapore

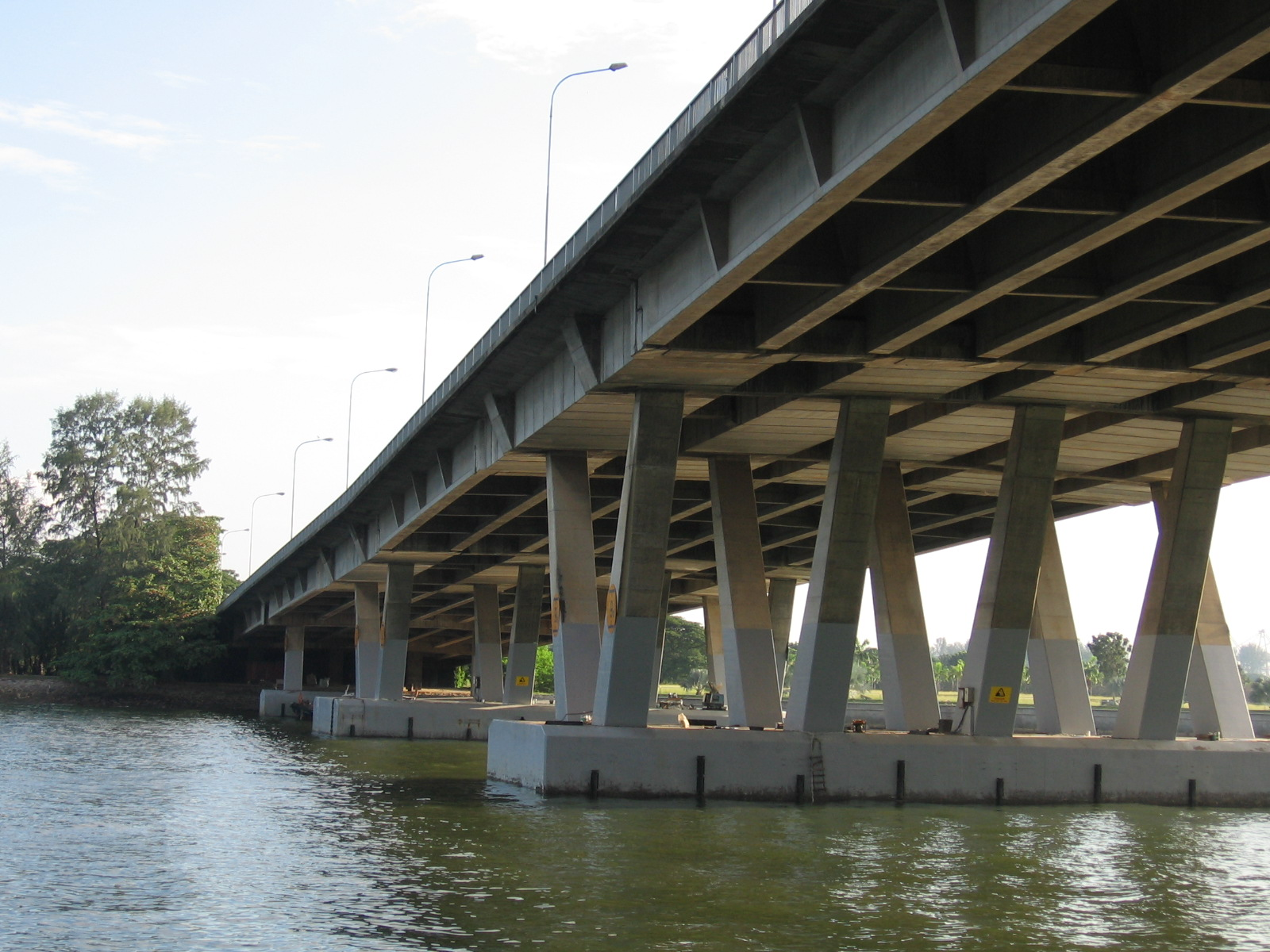
- Benjamin Sheares Bridge in October 2005
- Coordinates: 1°17′33″N 103°51′44″E
- Carries: Motor vehicles and pedestrians
- Crosses: Marina Reservoir
- Locale: Downtown Core and Kallang, Singapore
- Official name: Benjamin Sheares Bridge

Characteristics
- Design: Viaduct
- Total length: 1.8 km
- Height: 29m (tallest point at Kallang Basin)

History
- Designer: Public Works Department (now CPG Corporation)
- Constructed by: Sato Kogyo and Chan Chee Wah Maunsell & Partners
- Opened: 26 September 1981; 44 years ago

Location
- Interactive map of Benjamin Sheares Bridge

The Benjamin Sheares Bridge (Chinese: 薛尔思桥; pinyin: Xūeěrsī Qíao; Malay: Jambatan Benjamin Sheares; Tamil: பென்ஜமின் ஷியர்ஸ் பாலம்) is the longest bridge in Singapore, spanning 1.8 km, and the tallest, at 29 metres (95 ft). It is named after Benjamin Sheares, the second President of Singapore, who died four months before the bridge was opened to the public on 26 September 1981. The bridge is part of the East Coast Parkway (ECP), at the western end of the expressway. The cost of construction was S$110 million.

The bridge has one other exit (signed exit 15 on the ECP) for Rochor Road and Suntec City.

The Benjamin Sheares Bridge crosses over the Marina Reservoir, along the southern coast of mainland Singapore. It passes through the planning areas of Kallang, Marina East, Marina South and Downtown Core.

Built over reclaimed land by construction company Sato Kogyo, the bridge is made of pre-stressed concrete and links Tanjong Rhu on the east coast to Marina Bay on the west coast.

Benjamin Sheares Bridge is the setting for the annual SAFRA Singapore Bay Run & Army Half Marathon (formerly the Sheares Bridge Run).

It is also pictured on the rear panel of the Ship Series S$50 banknote.

== History ==
The East Coast Parkway (ECP) was first conceptualised in 1969 to reduce traffic at Golden Mile. The plans included the Benjamin Sheares Bridge, which was designed to be high-capacity bypass to the central area as well as to reduce congestion in Newton, Scotts, Paterson, and Outram roads during peak hour.

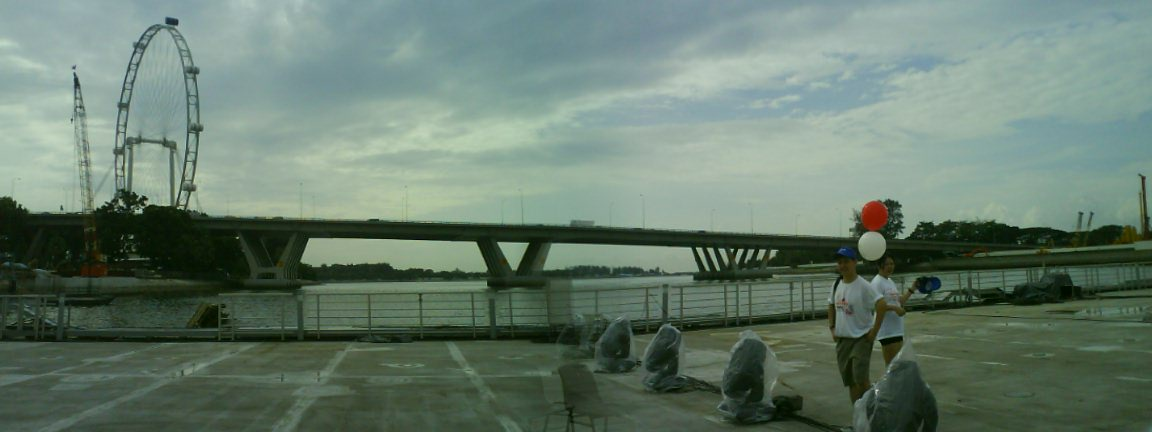
Benjamin Sheares Bridge and the Singapore Flyer (2007, under construction)

== See also ==
- List of bridges in Singapore
