= Marina Coastal Expressway =

Expressway in Singapore

Coordinates: 1.2950°N 103.8760°E

Marina Coastal Expressway
- Lebuhraya Pantai Marina (Malay) 滨海高速公路 (Chinese) மரினா கரையோர விரைவுச்சாலை (Tamil)

Route information
- Part of AH143
- Length: 5 km (3.1 mi)
- Existed: 2008–present
- History: Opened on 29 December 2013

Major junctions
- East end: Kallang (KPE, ECP)
- KPE, ECP, AYE
- West end: Keppel (AYE)

Location
- Country: Singapore
- Regions: Marina Bay, Kallang

Highway system
- Expressways of Singapore

The Marina Coastal Expressway (Abbreviation: MCE) is the tenth of Singapore's network of expressways. Construction for the MCE began in 2008 and was completed at the end of 2013. The expressway was officially opened on 28 December that year by Senior Minister of State Josephine Teo in the presence of emeritus Senior Minister Goh Chok Tong, and was opened for vehicular traffic the next day.

== Route ==
The 5-kilometre (3.1-mile) MCE connects with the southern end of the Kallang–Paya Lebar Expressway (KPE) and its junction with the East Coast Parkway (ECP) to the eastern end of the Ayer Rajah Expressway (AYE). This links the eastern and western parts of Singapore to the New Downtown, currently being developed in the Marina Bay area. The MCE, with five lanes in each direction, handles the large number of commuters to be drawn to the offices, homes and recreational attractions there. It opens access to the Marina Bay Cruise Centre Singapore in Marina South and the existing Marina South Pier.

The expressway comprises a 3.5-kilometre (2.2-mile) tunnel, while the rest are at grade or depressed, with a view of the Singapore Strait. The tunnel includes a 420-metre (460-yard) stretch that travels under the seabed, 150 metres (160 yards) away from the Marina Barrage. This had posed particular engineering challenges in the tunnel construction as large amounts of water were let out from the barrage from time to time. At its deepest point, the expressway lies about 20 metres (66 ft) under the seabed.

The 5-kilometre (3.1-mile) long MCE is Singapore's most expensive expressway. On 28 April 2009, the Land Transport Authority revealed that it has awarded about S$4.1 billion worth of contracts, much more than the initial estimate of $2.5 billion. The construction of the MCE also required undersea dredging. More than 22 hectares (54 acres) of land was reclaimed to build the MCE. In contrast, the KPE, which is 12 kilometres (7.5 mi) and has portions running under canals and rivers, cost only $1.74 billion.

== List of interchanges and exits ==
Location	km	mi	Flyover	Exit	Destinations	Notes
Downtown Core	0.0	0.0	Keppel Viaduct	—	AYE	Western terminus; expressway continues as Ayer Rajah Expressway (AYE)
Downtown Core	0.5	0.31	Keppel Viaduct	1	Straits Boulevard, Shenton Way, Maxwell Road	Westbound exit and eastbound entrance only
Straits View	1.0	0.62	—	2	Central Boulevard, Marina Coastal Drive, Marina Gardens Drive, Rochor Road	Signed as Exits 2 (eastbound) and 3 (westbound)
Marina South	2.5	1.6	—	3	Marina Coastal Drive, Central Boulevard	Signed as Exits 2 (eastbound) and 3 (westbound)
Marina East	4.4	2.7	Marina Coastal Expressway Tunnel	5	Fort Road, ECP (towards Changi)	Eastern terminus; expressway continues as Kallang–Paya Lebar Expressway (KPE)
1.000 mi = 1.609 km; 1.000 km = 0.621 mi: Incomplete access; Route transition

== History ==
A video of the Marina Coastal Expressway (MCE) taken from a car travelling in an east-to-west direction towards Tuas, from Exit 14B of the East Coast Parkway to where the MCE joins the Ayer Rajah Expressway

According to Today, the MCE first appeared in a plan to redevelop the Marina Bay area. In March 2006, the Land Transport Authority (LTA) announced a 5 kilometres (3.1 mi) extension of the Kallang–Paya Lebar Expressway (KPE) from its interface with the East Coast Parkway (ECP), and will join the Ayer Rajah Expressway (AYE). The extension was called the "Marina Coastal Expressway", though the LTA stressed that they intend it to be an extension of the KPE. Earlier in the month, the LTA invited companies to submit feasibility studies. Feasibility studies on the MCE were conducted, and were in the final stages by February 2007. Then Transport Minister Raymond Lim announced in July 2007 that approval had been given for the construction of the MCE at a cost of S$2.5 billion (2007) (US$1.66 billion). To construct the MCE, which was expected to start in 2008 and finish by the end of 2013, 13.3 hectares (33 acres) of land in Marina East and Marina Wharf would have to be reclaimed.

In October 2008, the LTA awarded two contracts out of six planned contracts for the MCE: a S$669.7 million (2008) (US$473.33 million) contract for Penta-Ocean Construction to design and construct a vehicular tunnel, as well as a S$732.6 million (2008) (US$517.79 million) contract for Sato Kogyo and Daelim Industrial for tunnels and roads. By November, another two contracts were awarded to Ssangyong Engineering & Construction and Samsung C&T, with the latter to build 950 metres (1,040 yd) of tunnels for S$716.4 million (2008) (US$506.34 million). However, the cost of the MCE ballooned to S$3.1 billion (2008) (US$2.19 billion), with increased engineering requirements since the Nicoll Highway Collapse in 2004 and poor soil conditions influencing the increased cost according to The Straits Times. In the same month, the LTA awarded Samsung C&T a S$634.8 million (2008) (US$448.67 million) contract to design and build a 800 metres (870 yd) twin-cell box vehicular tunnel and a slip tunnel, as well as a ventilation building and land reclamation works in Marina East. By January 2009, two different bids were made for a contract on building a section of the MCE around the Marina Wharf, with Hock Lian Seng Infrastructure bidding S$305 million (2008) (US$215.57 million) whilst Ed Zublin and Singapore Piling bidded S$600 million (2008) (US$424.07 million) to S$626 million (2008) (US$442.45 million). It was noted by The Straits Times that industry experts "were bewildered by the vast difference in the two bids", with a builder associated with LTA projects stating "the lower bid may be too low to be feasible. But if [the LTA] picks the higher bid, it may have to answer to taxpayers". Hock Lian Seng was later awarded the contract.

The expressway, which includes Singapore's first undersea tunnel, links the East Coast Parkway and Kallang-Paya Lebar Expressway to Marina South and Ayer Rajah Expressway and opened to traffic on 29 December 2013. After the MCE was opened, the segment of the ECP between Central Boulevard and Benjamin Sheares Bridge was downgraded to become Sheares Avenue. The segment of the ECP between the AYE and Central Boulevard was permanently demolished. The first few days of operations was plagued by heavy traffic congestion due to drivers' unfamiliarity with the expressway as well as connections with other roads and expressways. There was reportedly heavier than usual traffic, compared to using the old route via ECP, on 29 December 2013, the first day the MCE opened. The situation was exacerbated on the next day with the Monday morning peak hour traffic. However, the majority of drivers are aware of the road changes. On 28 September 2014, with the road changes in Marina South area, the Prince Edward Road exit was removed and was replaced by Straits Boulevard exit with the ERP gantry being relocated from Prince Edward Road to Straits Boulevard.
