= Clementi Road =

Road in Singapore

Coordinates: 1°19′8.36″N 103°46′16.07″E

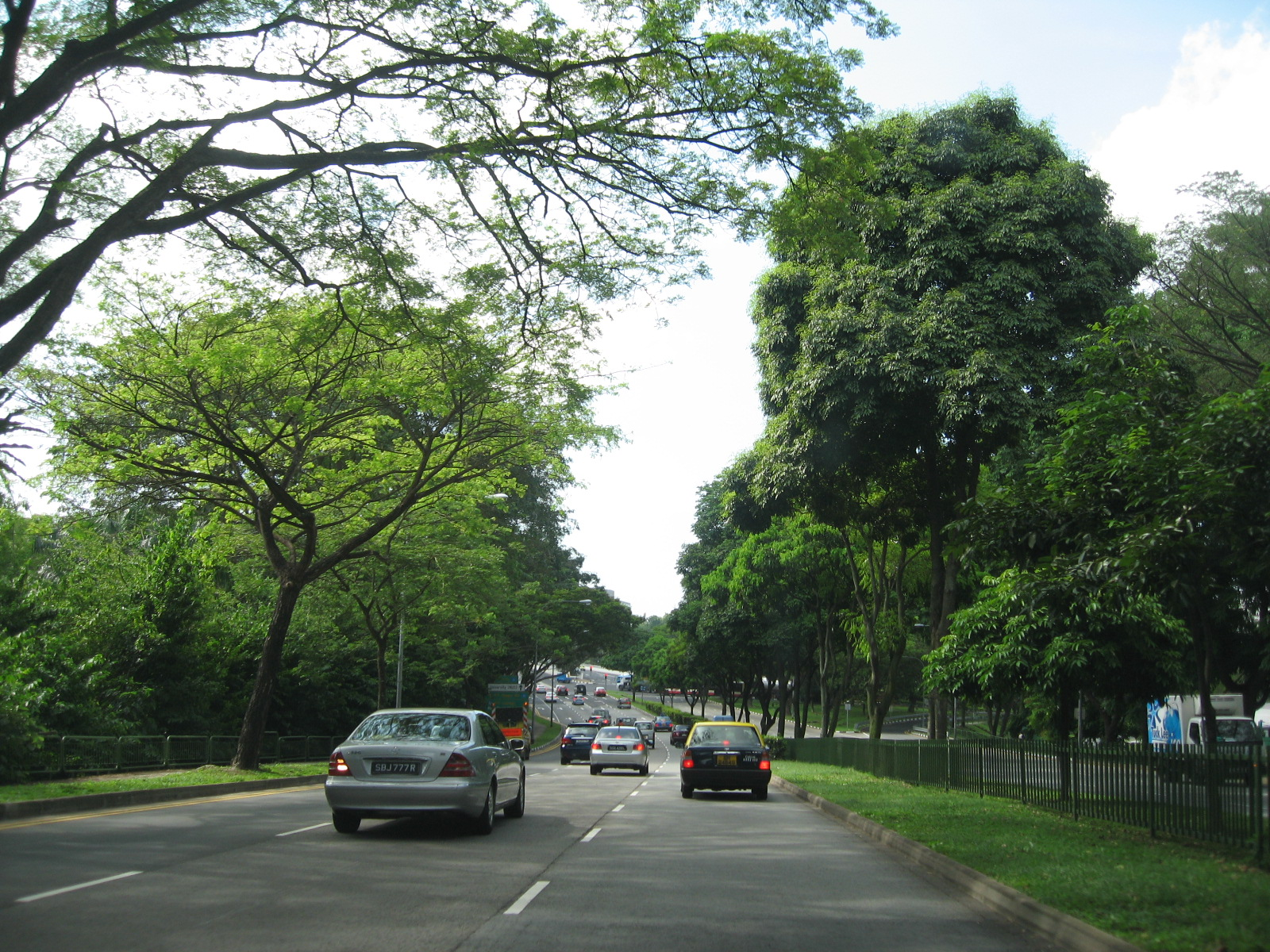
Much of Clementi Road is lined by trees

A video taken from a car travelling along Clementi Road at night from West Coast Road to Kent Ridge Crescent

Clementi Road (Chinese: 金文泰路) is a road in Singapore. Part of the wider AH2 road network, it starts at Bukit Timah Road and ends at West Coast Highway. Its landmarks include Maju Camp, the Singapore University of Social Sciences, Ngee Ann Polytechnic and National University of Singapore.

The road was once known as "Reformatory Road" as there was a boys' home situated along the road. In 1947, the Singapore Rural Board discussed renaming the road. Their original intention was to name it after Sir Hugh Clifford, but it was eventually named as Clementi Road. It is generally suggested that the road was named after Sir Cecil Clementi Smith, who was the first British High Commissioner in the Straits Settlements. However, it is also possible that the road was named after his nephew Sir Cecil Clementi, another former Governor of the Straits Settlements (1930–33) who initiated the construction of the Kallang Airport.
