= Jalan Ahmad Ibrahim =

Road in Singapore

Coordinates: 1.3220096°N 103.7139486°E

Name transcription(s)
  - Chinese: 惹兰阿末依布拉欣
  - Malay: Jalan Ahmad Ibrahim
- Interactive map of Jalan Ahmad Ibrahim
- Country: Singapore

Jalan Ahmad Ibrahim (Chinese: 惹兰阿末依布拉欣) is a road located in Boon Lay, Singapore. Named after Singaporean politician Ahmad Ibrahim, the road links Ayer Rajah Expressway with Jurong Hill Flyover.

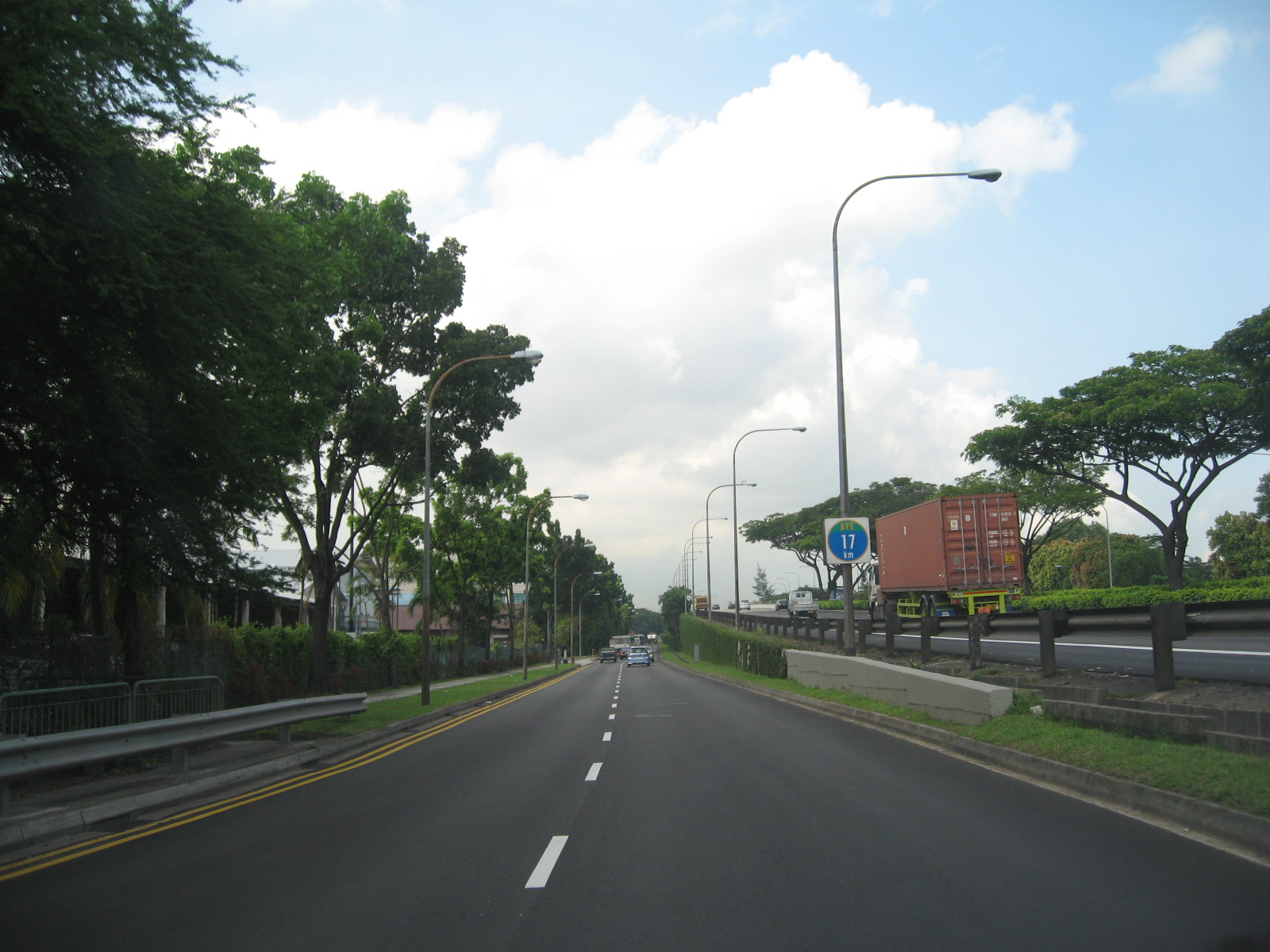
Jalan Ahmad Ibrahim slip road

== History ==
Built in 1961, it was the first road to be built as an expansion into Jurong, conceived at that time to be an industrial area. After the passing of Ahmad Ibrahim, the road was named after him in his honor after being completed in 1965. Jalan Ahmad Ibrahim first started from Jalan Bahru Selatan (Now Jurong Town Hall Road) to Jalan Bandaran/Jalan Besi (Now Pioneer Road/Pioneer Road North).

In 1998, Ayer Rajah Expressway was further expanded into Tuas. The extension followed the alignment of Jalan Ahmad Ibrahim. The road was widened, with all roundabouts replaced with flyovers, and interchanges and slip roads built along some parts of the expressway to serve the existing establishments along the road. Eventually, the slip roads took on the name "Jalan Ahmad Ibrahim".
