= West Coast Highway, Singapore =

Road in Singapore

West Coast Highway
- Lebuhraya Pantai Barat (Malay) 西海岸大路 (Chinese) மேற்கு கடற்கரை நெடுஞ்சாலை (Tamil)
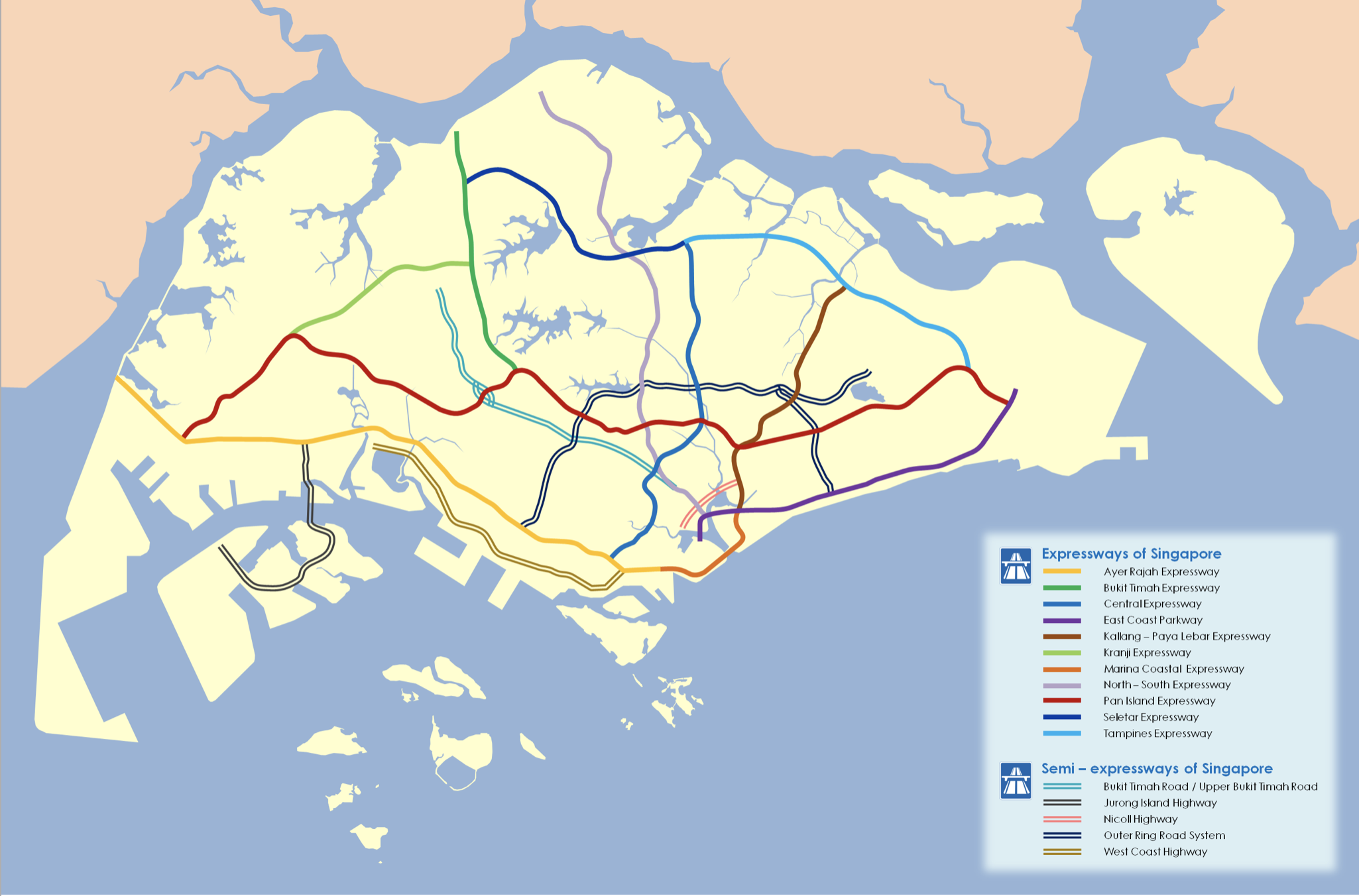
- West Coast Highway is labelled in double yellow line

Route information
- Length: 11 km (6.8 mi)
- History: At-grade road widened in 2000; Viaduct completed in 2006

Major junctions
- West end: West Coast
- East end: Tanjong Pagar (AYE)

Location
- Country: Singapore

Highway system
- Expressways of Singapore

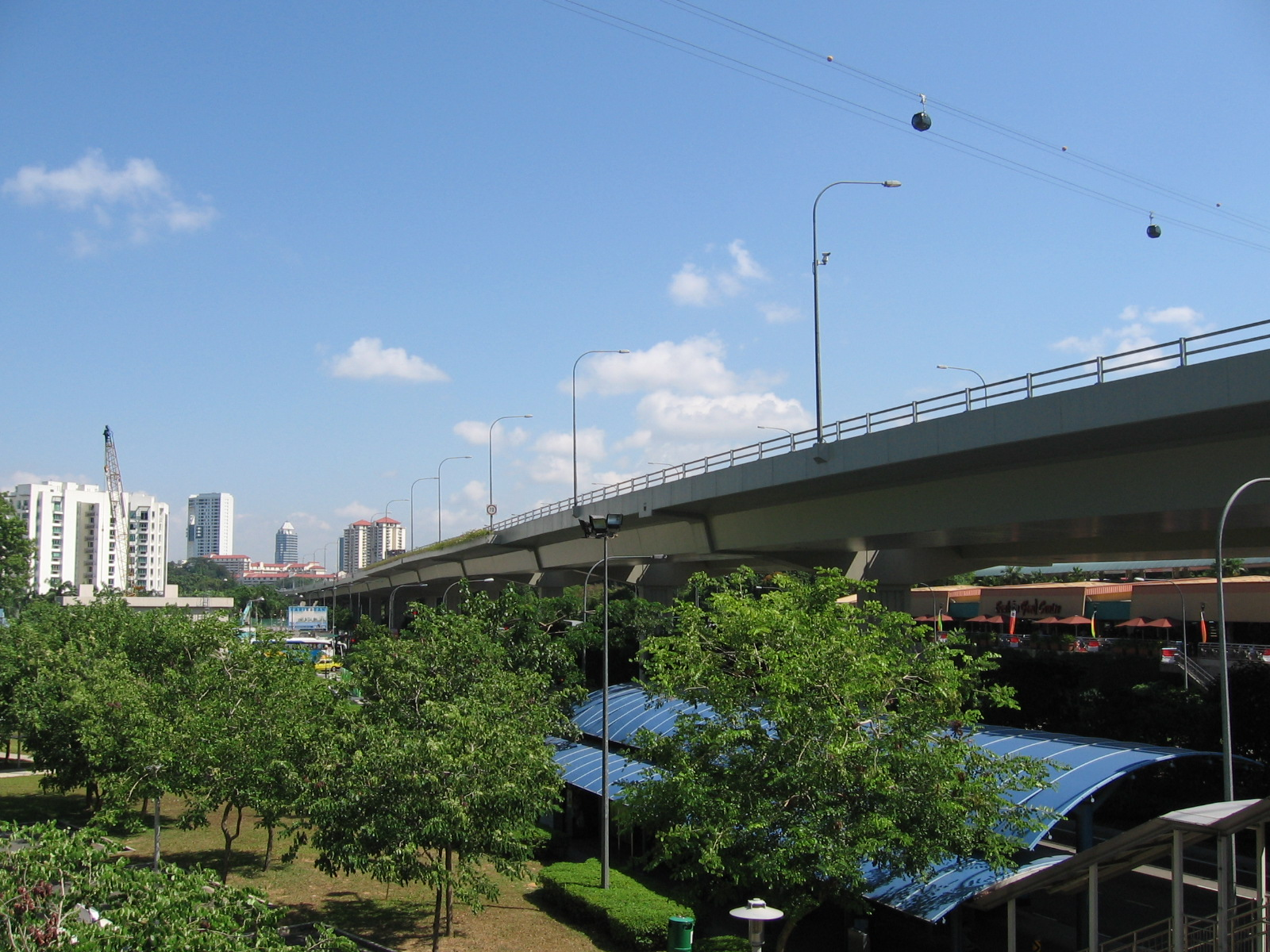
West Coast Highway viaduct, near HarbourFront Centre.

West Coast Highway (Chinese: 西海岸大路; Malay: Lebuhraya Pantai Barat; Tamil: மேற்கு கடற்கரை நெடுஞ்சாலை) is a major arterial road in Singapore which links Jurong industrial estate and Clementi New Town to the city. It is an at-grade road from its junction with Pandan Loop and West Coast Road to its interchange with Pasir Panjang Road, where it becomes a grade-separated viaduct; the viaduct merges with Keppel Road before its interchange with Ayer Rajah Expressway. The total length of the highway is 11 km. The viaduct is newer than the at-grade section, having been completed in 2006.

Despite what its name may suggest, the speed limit on the highway is less than that of an expressway. The highway also has a few traffic light junctions, something that expressways do not have. The at-grade section of the highway is a three-lane dual carriageway, and the viaduct is a two-lane dual carriageway with a 1-metre hard shoulder. At a length of 5 km, the viaduct is the longest in Singapore.

== Extension ==
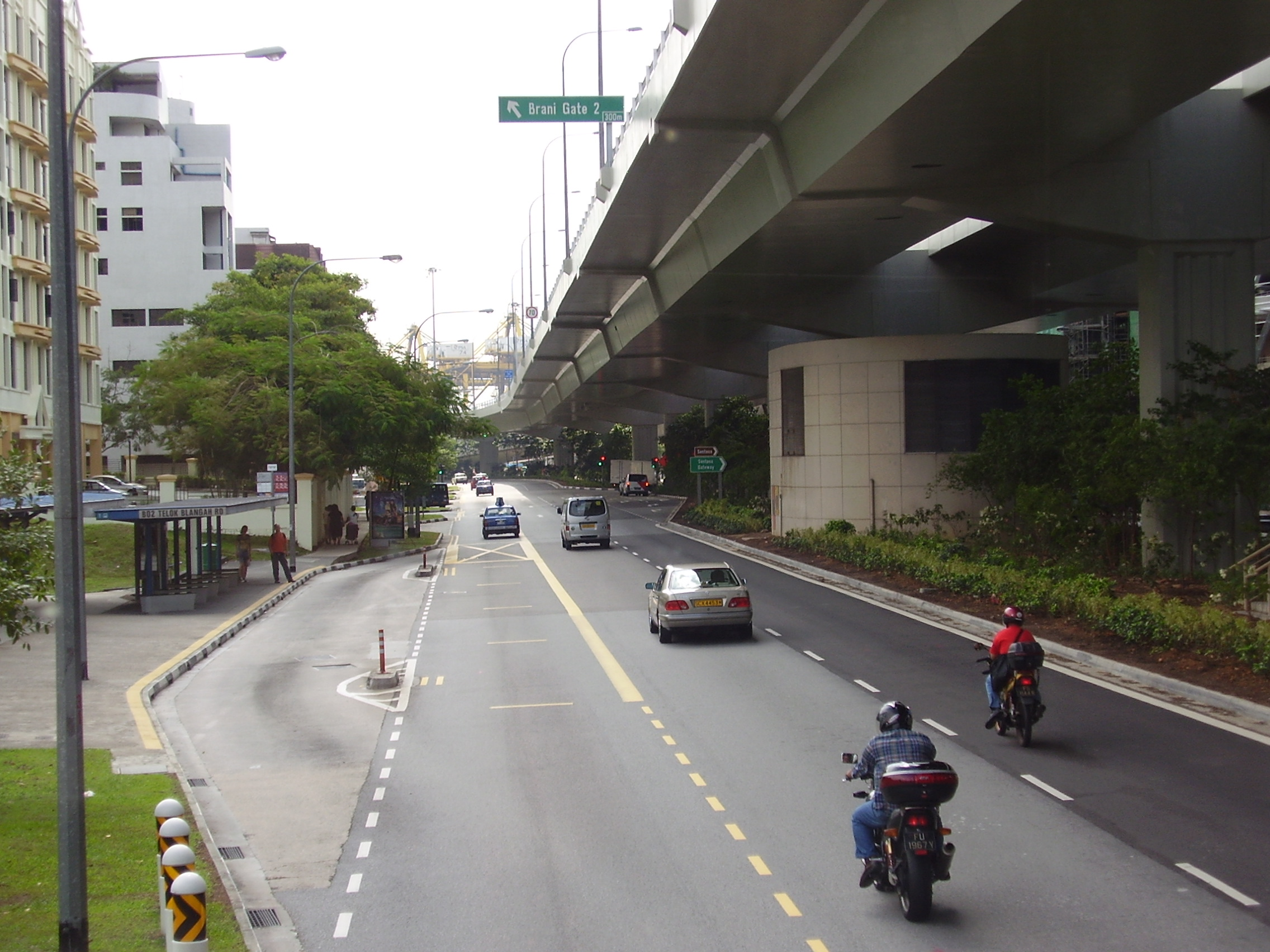
West Coast Highway viaduct, just before exit ramp to container terminals. Below it is Telok Blangah Road.

The Land Transport Authority started modifying and extending the highway in the late 1990s, in response to the increased amount of traffic using it. Its intersection with Clementi Road was widened in 2000. To allow motorists to bypass intersections at Pasir Panjang Road, LTA's plans also called for the construction of a viaduct that would provide a direct link from the highway to Keppel Road on the outskirts of the city area. The viaduct was built in two phases of 2.4 km each. The first phase, from Keppel Road to Telok Blangah Street 31, started construction in 1998 and was opened to traffic on 27 April 2002.

The contract to build the second phase of the viaduct from Telok Blangah Street 31 to the highway's junction with Pasir Panjang Road, worth S$16.7 million, was awarded to L&M Prestressing in January 2000, and the viaduct was expected to be complete by July 2003. However, work slowed in late 2002 because L&M encountered financial problems. L&M then promised LTA that the viaduct would be completed in May 2005. LTA agreed to give the company time to complete it, but when work had still not finished by that time, LTA terminated the contract on 1 June 2005 and called for an open tender to find a new contractor to finish the work. On 1 August 2005, LTA awarded the contract to Gammon, which completed the remaining work on schedule in March 2006. The viaduct's completion was commemorated with an opening ceremony and fun walk on 25 March 2006, with the then Minister for Transport Yeo Cheow Tong officiating; it was opened to traffic on 26 March 2006.

At the same time, the intersection of the highway with Jalan Buroh was converted from a box junction into a controlled roundabout with traffic lights. A slip road allows motorists to get to Jalan Buroh from the direction of the city without having to stop. The conversion started in May 2001 and was completed in the third quarter of 2005. The roundabout was converted back into a box junction after the opening of a new flyover across Jalan Buroh in November 2016.

In May 2009 construction of a new dual three-lane flyover at the junction of West Coast Highway and Clementi Road started. The flyover will cost S$57.5 million. The flyover allows motorists to bypass the current traffic light junction and shorten travel time along the highway. The flyover was completed in the third quarter of 2011.

== Viaduct entrances and exits ==
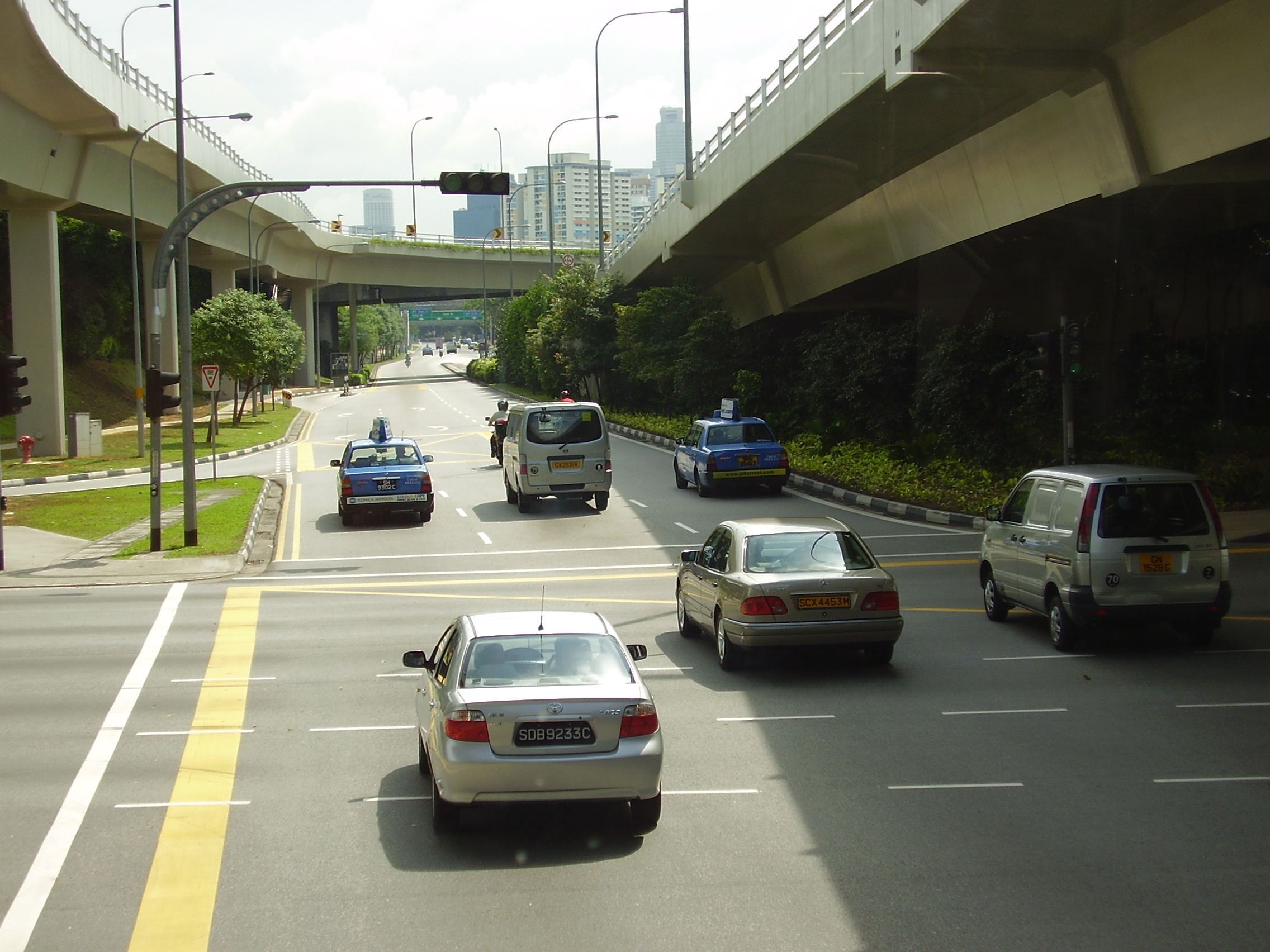
West Coast Highway extension merges with Keppel Road. The U-shaped exit ramp for vehicles going to the container terminals is in the top left corner of the photo.

There are 2 entry ramps for the entire viaduct travelling towards the city – one at its start before the junction with Pasir Panjang Road, and another after the junction with Morse Road, near Henderson Road. Thus, city-bound motorists who miss the entry ramp at Pasir Panjang will have to travel for another 2.4 km – half the length of the viaduct – before they can get onto it at Morse Road. There are 2 exit ramps – a U-shaped one just before Kampong Bahru Road, intended for vehicles going to the Keppel and Pulau Brani container terminals, and the other one after Kampong Bahru Road, where the viaduct merges with Keppel Road.

Travelling towards Clementi, there is one entry ramp – before Kampong Bahru Road. There are three exit ramps, one before Henderson Road, one before Alexandra Road and another after Pasir Panjang Road.

== Prominent places ==
West Coast Highway passes by the following places:

- West Coast Park
- Haw Par Villa
- Pasir Panjang container terminal and Pasir Panjang Distripark
- Labrador Park
- HarbourFront
- VivoCity

== See also ==
- Expressways of Singapore
- Outer Ring Road System
- Nicoll Highway
