= List of Singapore abbreviations =

This list of Singapore abbreviations sets out abbreviations that are commonly used in Singapore.

== Overview ==
Abbreviations are of three basic kinds:

- Clippings, in which a shortened form of a word occurs. Common clippings in Singapore are: air-con (from "air-conditioner"), condo (from "condominium"), sabo (from "sabotage"), and cert (from "certificate").
- Acronyms, in which the initial letters are formed into a single word, such as scuba, which is derived from "self-contained underwater breathing apparatus". Creation of acronyms such as this is rare in Singaporean English, though TIBS (/ˈtɪbz/, "Trans-Island Bus Service") and CISCO (/ˈsɪskoʊ/, "Commercial and Industrial Security Corporation") are found.
- Initialisms, in which the individual letters are spelled out. This is by far the most common category in Singapore, including PAP ("People's Action Party") and PIE ("Pan-Island Expressway"), which are pronounced /ˌpiː ˌeɪ ˈpiː/ and /ˌpiː ˌaɪ ˈiː/ respectively and never */ˈpæp/ and */ˈpaɪ/. Some analysts regard such initialisms a kind of acronym, but others prefer to distinguish between the two categories.

Initialisms are extremely common in Singapore, and many have become better known and more widely used than the full form of the words they represent. One example is Kandang Kerbau Women's and Children's Hospital ("Kandang Kerbau" is often abbreviated to KK, creating "KK Women's and Children's Hospital"), which is more commonly referred to as KKH.

Initialisms for government departments and public institutions are the most important category of initialisms in Singapore. Among the earliest examples are PUB ("Public Utilities Board") and HDB ("Housing Development Board"). Abbreviations such as these were especially important in the past when most Singaporeans were not educated in English, and their use facilitated communication in the public services where the main administrative language is English. Government departments have therefore promoted the use of these initialisms, so they occur even in non-English publications. Although the younger generation of Singaporeans are now all educated in English, abbreviations remain a major characteristic of Singapore English.

There are efforts to maintain consistency among the initialisms. Three letters are used for government institutions (PUB, HDB, CPF, MOH, CWO) and for expressways (AYE, PIE, KJE), while two letters are used for polytechnics (SP, RP). To maintain this consistency, some abbreviations are not direct initials; for example, CTE is used for "Central Expressway" instead of *CE, and NP is used for "Ngee Ann Polytechnic" instead of *NAP. When the Nanyang Technological University (NTU) was established in 1991, the name was chosen instead of the alternative "Nanyang University of Technology" because the latter would have resulted in the unsuitable NUT, while Anderson Secondary School has shortened its name to ANDSS instead of ASS.

Recently, there have emerged a number of unconventional abbreviations, such as A*STAR for Agency for Science, Technology and Research.) When SAFTI (Singapore Armed Forces Training Institute) was reorganised in 1995, it acquired the name SAFTI Military Institute, further abbreviated as SAFTI MI, which, when fully expanded, would form Singapore Armed Forces Training Institute Military Institute.

== Abbreviations ==
=== 0–9 ===
- 4D - 4-Digits, a Singapore lottery
- 5 C's - Five Cs of Singapore: Cash, Car, Credit card, Condominium, Country club
- 6 C's - Six Cs of Singapore: Career, Cash, Car, Credit card, Condominium, Country club

=== A ===
- AA - Asian Aerospace
- AAA - Authorised Adoption Agency
- ABS - Association of Banks in Singapore
- ABSD - Additional Buyer's Stamp Duty
- ACA - Adoption of Children Act
- ACDT - AVS-Accredited Certified Dog Trainer
- ACJC - Anglo-Chinese Junior College
- ACM - Asian Civilisations Museum
- ACP - Advance Care Planning
- ACRA - Accounting and Corporate Regulatory Authority
- ACRES - Animal Concerns Research and Education Society
- ACS (J) - Anglo-Chinese School (Junior)
- ACS (P) - Anglo-Chinese School (Primary)
- ACS - Anglo-Chinese School
- ACS(I) - Anglo-Chinese School (Independent)
- ACSBR - Anglo-Chinese School (Barker Road)
- AFTA - ASEAN Free Trade Area
- A & G - Allen & Gledhill, a law firm
- AG - Attorney-General
- AGC - Attorney-General's Chambers
- AHS - Anglican High School
- AISS - Ahmad Ibrahim Secondary School, Australian International School Singapore
- AJ - (Pig Latin slang) Gay (typically male)
- AJC - Anderson Junior College (now merged with Serangoon Junior College to form Anderson Serangoon Junior College)
- ALL - Animal Lovers League
- AMDK - (slang, derogatory) White man (from ang moh dua kee)
- AMK - Ang Mo Kio
- AMP - Association of Muslim Professionals
- AMTP - Adult Monthly Travel Pass
- ANDSS - Anderson Secondary School
- APB - Asia Pacific Breweries
- APP - Assistant Public Prosecutor (see also "DPP" and "PP")
- APPLES - Application for Passport On-line Electronic System
- AR - Assistant Registrar of the Supreme Court of Singapore
- ARF - Additional Registration Fees
- ART:DIS - Arts & Disability (non-profit organization)
- ASA - Adoption Suitability Assessment
- ASD - Action for Singapore Dogs
- ASEF - Asia-Europe Foundation
- ASRJC - Anderson Serangoon Junior College
- A*STAR - Agency for Science, Technology and Research (formerly NSTB)
- AVA - Agri-Food and Veterinary Authority of Singapore
- AVS - Animal and Veterinary Service
- AWARE - Association of Women for Action and Research
- AWWA - Asian Women Welfare Association
- AY - Academic Year
- AYE - Ayer Rajah Expressway

=== B ===
- BB - Boys' Brigade
- BBSS - Bukit Batok Secondary School
- BC - Birth Certificate
- BCA - Building and Construction Authority
- BCAA - BCA Academy
- BCM - Bus Contracting Model
- BCRS - Beverage Container Return Scheme
- BBDC - Bukit Batok Driving Centre
- BBFA - (internet slang) Bui Bui Forever Alone
- BBT - Bukit Batok / Bubble Tea
- BDK - Bedok
- BDS - Bedok South Secondary School
- BF - Buddhist Fellowship (Singapore)
- BGR - (slang) boy-girl relationship
- BJ - Bugis Junction
- BKE - Bukit Timah Expressway
- BMT - Basic Military Training
- BOA - Board of Architects
- BPGHS - Bukit Panjang Government High School
- BPLRT - Bukit Panjang LRT Line
- BPP - Bukit Panjang Plaza
- BPT - Basic Police Training
- BPJ - Bukit Panjang
- BRT - Basic Rescue Training
- BSEP - Bus Service Enhancement Programme
- BTNR - Bukit Timah Nature Reserve
- BTO - Build To Order (HDB)
- BTS - Baptist Theological Seminary
- BTT - Basic Theory Test
- BTVSS - Bukit View Secondary School
- BTYSS - Beatty Secondary School
- BVSS - Buona Vista Secondary School
- BWSS - Bowen Secondary School

=== C ===
- CAAS - Civil Aviation Authority of Singapore
- CAD - Commercial Affairs Department
- CAG - Changi Airport Group
- CAS - Causes for Animals Singapore
- CASE - Consumers Association of Singapore
- CBD - Central Business District
- CBP - Changi Business Park
- CBPU - Central Building Plan Unit
- CBS - Community Based Sentence
- CCA - Co-curricular activity
- CCC - Chinese Chamber of Commerce; Citizen's Consultative Committee
- CCHS - Chung Cheng High School
- CCK - Choa Chu Kang
- CCL or CC - Circle MRT line
- CCNR - Central Catchment Nature Reserve
- CCP - Career Conversion Programme
- CCR - Core Central Region
- CCS or CCCS - Competition and Consumer Commission of Singapore
- CDAC - Chinese Development Assistance Council
- CDA - Communicable Diseases Agency
- CDC - Community Development Council or ComfortDelGro Driving Centre
- CDE - Centre for Domestic Employees
- CDG - ComfortDelGro
- CDP - Central Depository
- CEA - Council for Estate Agencies
- CECA - Comprehensive Economic Cooperation Agreement between India and Singapore
- CEPAS - Contactless e-Purse Application System
- CGEC - Community Garden Edibles Competition
- CGH - Changi General Hospital
- CHC - City Harvest Church
- CHIJ - Convent of the Holy Infant Jesus
- CHS - Catholic High School, Singapore
- CID - Criminal Investigation Department
- CIP - Community Involvement Project (now replaced by "VIA")
- CIQ - Custom & Immigration Quarantine
- CIS - Corporate Individual Scheme
- CJ - Chief Justice
- CJC - Catholic Junior College
- CLTPA - Criminal Law (Temporary Provisions) Act
- CMC - Chinese Media & Communication
- CMPB - Central Manpower Base
- CNA - Channel NewsAsia
- CNB - Central Narcotics Bureau
- CNY - Chinese New Year
- COAW - Code of Animal Welfare
- COE - Certificate of Entitlement
- COMPASS - Complementarity Assessment Framework or Composers and Authors Society of Singapore
- COP - Committee of Privileges
- COTMA - COVID-19 (Temporary Measures) Act 2020
- CPA - Council of Presidential Advisers
- CPF - Central Provident Fund
- CPFB - Central Provident Fund Board
- CPIB - Corrupt Practices Investigation Bureau
- CREATE - Campus for Research Excellence and Technological Enterprise
- CRL - Cross Island MRT line
- CS - Century Square
- CSA - Cyber Security Agency
- CSC - Community Sports Club or Civil Service College
- CSM - City Square Mall
- CSO - Community Service Order
- CTE - Central Expressway
- CTQ - Construction Temporary Quarter
- CTSS - Clementi Town Secondary School
- CWO - Corrective Work Order or Community Work Order
- CWP - Causeway Point
- CWS - Cat Welfare Society
- CYPA - Children and Young Persons Act

=== D ===
- D & D - Dinner & Dance, a function usually organised annually by companies
- D & N - Drew & Napier LLC, a law firm
- DART - Disaster Assistance and Rescue Team
- DBS - Development Bank of Singapore (now known as DBS Bank)
- DBSS - Design, Build and Sell Scheme
- DHS - Dunman High School
- DJ - District Judge
- DMN - Dunman Secondary School
- DOS - Department of Statistics Singapore
- DPM - Deputy Prime Minister
- DPP - Deputy Public Prosecutor (see also "APP" and "PP") or Direct Entry Scheme to Polytechnic Programme (via ITE)
- DR - Deputy Registrar of the Supreme Court or the Subordinate Courts of Singapore
- DRC - Drug Rehabilitation Centre or Directory of Renovation Contractors
- DRO - Day Reporting Order
- DSO - Defence Science Organisation
- DSTA - Defence Science and Technology Agency /ˈdɛstə/
- DTE - Downtown East
- DTF - Din Tai Fung
- DTL or DT - Downtown MRT line
- DTSWG - Dog Training Standards Workgroup

=== E ===
- EASE - Enhancement for Active Seniors
- EC - Executive Condominium
- ECDA - Early Childhood Development Agency
- ECP - East Coast Park / East Coast Parkway
- ECPS - East Coast Primary School
- EDB - Economic Development Board
- EDP - Endeavour Primary School or Electronic Deferred Payment
- EDSO - Enhanced Direct Supervision Order
- EFSS - Edgefield Secondary School
- eGAP - eGovernment Action Plan
- EIP - Ethnic Integration Policy
- EJC - Eunoia Junior College
- ELD - Elections Department Singapore
- EMA - Energy Market Authority
- EP - Employment Pass or Exit Permit
- EPMA - Environmental Protection and Management Act
- EPR - Extended Producer Responsibility
- ERP - Electronic Road Pricing
- ESPS - East Spring Primary School
- ESR - Economic Strategy Review
- EWL or EW - East–West MRT line

=== F ===
- FA - Financial Adviser
- FAA - Financial Advisers Act
- FAS - Financial Assistance Scheme or Football Association of Singapore
- FAST - Fast And Secure Transfers
- FCBC - Faith Community Baptist Church
- FCD - Factory-Converted Dormitory
- FDW - Foreign Domestic Worker
- FEC - Future Economy Council
- FFL - Families for Live
- FG - Filmgarde Cineplexes
- FHSS - Fuhua Secondary School
- FIN - Foreign Identification Number
- FMSS - Fairfield Methodist Secondary School
- FMPS or FFP - Fairfield Methodist Primary School
- FOSS - Forum of Small States
- FTT - Final Theory Test
- FT - Foreign Talent
- FWTES - Foreign Worker Tenant Enquiry Service

=== G ===
- GAD - Go and Die
- GAS - Go-Ahead Singapore
- GB - Girls' Brigade
- GBTB - Gardens by the Bay
- GCB - Good Class Bungalow
- GCE - General Certificate of Education
- GCM - Government Contracting Model (now replaced by Bus Contracting Model)
- GCT - Goh Chok Tong
- GE - General Election, Great Eastern
- GEP - Gifted Education Programme
- GIC - Government of Singapore Investment Corporation
- GIS - Global Indian School or Genome Institute of Singapore
- GLC - Government-Linked Company
- GLS - Government Land Sales
- GovTech - Government Technology Agency
- GP - General Practitioner, General Paper, Gladiolus Place
- GRA - Gambling Regulatory Authority
- GRC - Group representation constituency
- GSS - Great Singapore Sale
- GST - Goods and Services Tax
- GV - Golden Village
- GWA - GEMS World Academy
- GWC - Great World City
- GYSS - Guangyang Secondary School

=== H ===
- HCA - HomeCare Assist
- HCI - Hwa Chong Institution
- HCJC - Hwa Chong Junior College (now merged with The Chinese High School to form Hwa Chong Institution)
- HSCA - Healthcare Services Act
- HDB - Housing Development Board
- HEB - Hindu Endowments Board
- HFE - HDB Flat Eligibility
- HG - Hougang
- HLB - Hotels Licensing Board
- HOGC - Heart of God Church
- HIP - Home Improvement Programme
- HPB - Health Promotion Board
- HPPS - Henry Park Primary School
- HPS - Home Protection Scheme
- HS - Hougang Secondary School
- HSA - Health Sciences Authority
- HYSS - Hua Yi Secondary School
- HSCS - Hai Sing Catholic School
- HTX - Home Team Science and Technology Agency
- HUDC - Housing and Urban Development Company

=== I ===
- IBF - Institute of Banking and Finance Singapore
- IC - Identity health, In charge or Identification Certificate/Card
- ICBC - Industrial and Commercial Bank of China
- ICA - Immigration & Checkpoints Authority
- ICS - International Community School of Singapore
- ID - Intellectual disabilities
- IDA - Infocomm Development Authority of Singapore
- IDAPE - Interim Disability Assistance Programme for the Elderly
- IJC - Innova Junior College (now merged with Yishun Junior College to form Yishun Innova Junior College)
- IMDA - Infocomm Media Development Authority of Singapore
- IMH - Institute of Mental Health
- INLIS - Integrated Land Information Service
- INSEAD - Institut européen d'administration des affaires (European Institute of Business Administration, non-profit business school)
- IO - Investigation Officer
- IP - Integrated Programme or Integrated Shield Plan
- IPC - Institution of a Public Character
- IPOS - Intellectual Property Office of Singapore
- IPPT - Individual Physical Proficiency Test
- IPS - Institute of Policy Studies
- IR - Integrated Resort
- IRAS - Inland Revenue Authority of Singapore
- IRO - Inter-Religious Organisation of Singapore
- ISA - Internal Security Act
- ISCA - Institute of Singapore Chartered Accountants
- ISD - Internal Security Department
- ISEAS - Institute of Southeast Asian Studies
- ITE - Institute of Technical Education
- ITM - Industry Transformation Map
- IUP - Interim Upgrading Programme

=== J ===
- J - Judge (plural: JJ)
- J8 - Junction 8 Shopping Centre
- JA - Judge of Appeal (plural: JJA)
- JB - Johor Bahru
- JC - Judicial Commissioner or Junior College
- JCA - Jewel Changi Airport
- JBJ - Joshua Benjamin Jeyaretnam
- JEM - Jurong East Mall
- JEMP - Jurong East Modification Project
- JJC - Jurong Junior College (now merged with Pioneer Junior College to form Jurong Pioneer Junior College)
- JoY - Journey with You
- JP - Jurong Point Shopping Mall
- JPJC - Jurong Pioneer Junior College
- JPS - Jagoh Primary School
- JRL or JR - Jurong Region MRT line
- JSS - Jurong Secondary School
- JTC - Jurong Town Corporation (now known as JTC Corporation)
- JYSS - Juying Secondary School

=== K ===
- KCPSS - Kuo Chuan Presbyterian Secondary School
- KIV - Keep In View; refers to items, documents or papers that should be kept around for later consideration
- KJE - Kranji Expressway
- KK - Kandang Kerbau Women's and Children's Hospital
- KL - Kuala Lumpur, Malaysia
- KMSPKS - Kong Meng San Phor Kark See Monastery
- KPE - Kallang-Paya Lebar Expressway
- KTPH - Khoo Teck Puat Hospital

=== L ===
- LCK - Lim Chu Kang
- LCCS - Lutheran Community Care Services
- LHL - Lee Hsien Loong
- LIMA - Least Intrusive, Minimally Aversive
- LKCNHM - Lee Kong Chian Natural History Museum
- LKCM - Lee Kong Chian School of Medicine
- LKY - Lee Kuan Yew
- LNY - Lunar New Year
- LO - Leader of the Opposition
- LPA - Lasting Power of Attorney
- LQS - Local Qualifying Salary
- LRT - Light Rapid Transit
- LSB - Land Surveyors Board
- LTA - Land Transport Authority
- LTVP - Long-Term Visit Pass
- LUP - Lift Upgrading Programme
- LYSS - Loyang Secondary School

=== M ===
- MAH - Mount Alvernia Hospital
- MAS - Monetary Authority of Singapore
- MBFC - Marina Bay Financial Centre
- MBLM - Marina Bay Link Mall
- MBS - Marina Bay Sands
- MBSC - Marina Bay Singapore Countdown
- MC - Medical Certificate
- MCCY - Ministry of Culture, Community and Youth
- MCCS - Marine Climate Change Science Programme
- MCD - Ministry of Community Development (now MCYS)
- MCE - Marina Coastal Expressway
- MCI - Ministry of Communications and Information (now MDDI)
- MCS - Methodist Church in Singapore
- MCST - Management Corporation Strata Title
- MCYS - Ministry of Community Development, Youth and Sports (Singapore)
- MD - Managing Director
- MDA - Media Development Authority (now IMDA)
- MDDI - Ministry of Digital Development and Information (formerly MCI)
- MDIS - Management Development Institute of Singapore
- MENDAKI - Yayasan MENDAKI (formerly the Council for the Education of Muslim Children, now the Council for the Development of Singapore Muslim Community)
- MFA - Ministry of Foreign Affairs (Singapore)
- MGS - Methodist Girls' School
- MHA - Ministry of Home Affairs (Singapore)
- MI - Millennia Institute
- MID - Ministry of Interior and Defence (now split into MINDEF and MHA)
- MJC - Meridian Junior College (now merged with Tampines Junior College to form Tampines Meridian Junior College)
- MJR - Manjusri Secondary School
- MINDEF - Ministry of Defence (Singapore)
- MINDS - Movement For The Intellectually Disabled Of Singapore
- MND - Ministry of National Development (Singapore)
- MOE - Ministry of Education (Singapore)
- MOF - Ministry of Finance (Singapore)
- MOH - Ministry of Health (Singapore)
- MOHH - Ministry of Health (Holdings)
- MOM - Ministry of Manpower (Singapore)
- MOP - Minimum Occupation Period
- MOS - Minister of State
- MP - Member of Parliament
- MPA - Maritime and Port Authority of Singapore
- MPS - Meet the People Session
- MRHA - Maintenance of Religious Harmony Act
- MRT - Mass Rapid Transit
- MSCC - Multi-stakeholder Collaboration Committee
- MSCP - Multi Storey Car Park
- MSE - Ministry of Sustainability and the Environment
- MSF - Ministry of Social and Family Development (Singapore)
- MSHS - Maris Stella High School
- MSL - Marsiling Secondary School
- MSRDP - Marine Science Research and Development Programme
- MSS - Meridian Secondary School or Montfort Secondary School
- MTI - Ministry of Trade and Industry
- MTO - Mandatory Treatment Order
- MUIS - Majlis Ugama Islam Singapura (Islamic Religious Council of Singapore)
- MUP - Main Upgrading Programme
- MWC - Migrant Workers’ Centre

=== N ===
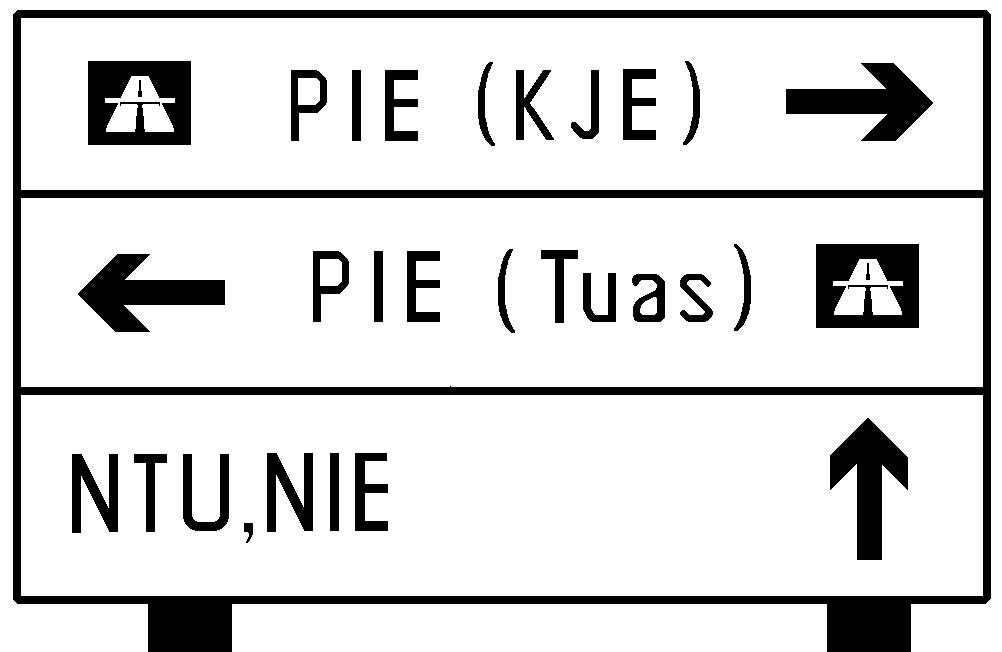
A road sign outside the campus of the Nanyang Technological University (NTU), from Singapore English (2007) by David Deterding.

- NAC - National Arts Council
- NAFA - Nanyang Academy of Fine Arts
- NAMS - National Addictions Management Service
- NAPFA - National Physical Fitness Award
- NAPS - Ngee Ann Primary School
- NAS - National Archives of Singapore
- NAVH - National Anti-Violence and Sexual Harassment Helpline
- NBrSS - Northbrooks Secondary School
- NCC - National Cadet Corps (Singapore) or New Creation Church
- NCCS - National Cancer Centre Singapore
- NCDCC - National Civil Defence Cadet Corps (Singapore)
- NCMP - Non-constituency Member of Parliament
- NCS - National Computer Systems
- NCSS - National Council of Social Service
- NDP - National Day Parade
- NDR - National Day Rally
- NE - National Education
- NEA - National Environment Agency
- NEL or NE - North East MRT line
- NETS - Network for Electronic Transfers
- NESST - Nurture Engage Support Shape Transform
- NHB - National Heritage Board
- NHG - National Healthcare Group
- NHHS - Nan Hua High School
- NIE - National Institute of Education
- NIMOS - National Institute for Marine and Ocean Sciences
- NJC - National Junior College
- NKF - National Kidney Foundation Singapore
- NLB - National Library Board
- NMP - Nominated Member of Parliament
- NMS - National Museum of Singapore
- NOC - NUS Overseas Colleges
- NOO - Notification of Offence
- NP - Ngee Ann Polytechnic
- NParks - National Parks Board
- NPCC - National Police Cadet Corps
- NPHVA - National Private Hire Vehicles Association
- NRF - National Research Foundation, Singapore
- NRIC - National Registration Identity Card
- NRP - Neighbourhood Renewal Programme
- NS - National Service in Singapore
- NSAS - National Space Agency of Singapore
- NSC - National Skin Centre or North-South Corridor
- NSCC - National Supercomputing Centre
- NSE - North–South Expressway (Singapore)
- NSF - Full-time National Servicemen
- NSL or NS - North–South MRT line
- NSTB - National Science and Technology Board (now A*STAR)
- NTC - National Technical Certificate
- NTFGH - Ng Teng Fong General Hospital
- NTPS - New Town Primary School
- NTU - Nanyang Technological University
- NTUC - National Trades Union Congress
- NUH - National University Hospital
- NUHS - National University Health System
- NUS - National University of Singapore
- NUSH or NUSHS - National University of Singapore High School of Mathematics and Science
- NWC - National Wages Council
- NYC - National Youth Council
- NYGH - Nanyang Girls' High School
- NYJC - Nanyang Junior College
- NYK - Nanyang Kindergarten
- NYP - Nanyang Polytechnic
- NYPS - Nanyang Primary School

=== O ===
- OB - Out of Bounds (see OB marker)
- OBU - On-Board Unit (electronic device installed inside a vehicle for toll collection)
- OBS - Outward Bound Singapore
- OCBC - Oversea-Chinese Banking Corporation
- OCHA - Online Criminal Harms Act
- OCR - Outside of Central Region
- OCS - Officer Cadet School (Singapore)
- OCSS - The Oxford and Cambridge Society of Singapore
- OFS - Overseas Family School
- OFWAS - Online Foreign Worker Address Service
- OGP - Open Government Products
- OMV - Open Market Value
- OPSS - Orchid Park Secondary School
- ORD - Operationally Ready Date, refers to the date on which a National Serviceman completes his 2-year term of service.
- OSS - Outram Secondary School
- OSSEA - Orchid Society of South East Asia
- OUB - Overseas Union Bank
- O$P$ - Definition: 'owe money, pay money' Harassment graffiti. (Informal and unlawful business) (Typically used by loan sharks or unlawful monetary loaning companies, usually ran by illegal societies in Singapore)

=== P ===
- PA - People's Association
- PAP - People's Action Party
- PBD - Purpose-Built Dormitories
- PCK - Phua Chu Kang, a popular TV sitcom
- PCMR - Presidential Council for Minority Rights
- PCN - Park Connector Network
- PCRRH - Presidential Council for Racial and Religious Harmony
- PCSS - Pet Cat Sterilisation Support
- PDD - Punggol Digital District
- PDI - Private Driving Instructor
- PDL - Provisional Driving Licence
- PDPA - Personal Data Protection Act
- PDPC - Personal Data Protection Commission
- PE - Physical Education
- PEB - Professional Engineers Board
- PEC - Presidential Elections Committee
- PECC - Pacific Economic Cooperation Council
- PES - Physical Employment Status. Pre-enlistment medical categorisation used by the Singapore Armed Forces to determine fitness for combat or non-combat duties
- PFP - Polytechnic Foundation Programme
- PG or PGL - Punggol
- PGP - Prince George's Park Residences, NUS
- PGVP - Punggol View Primary School
- PHC - Public Hygiene Council
- PHS - Presbyterian High School
- PHV - Private Hire Vehicle
- PIE - Pan Island Expressway
- PJC - Pioneer Junior College (now merged with Jurong Junior College to form Jurong Pioneer Junior College)
- PLMA - Pre-Marriage Long-Term Visit Pass Assessment
- PLMGPS - Paya Lebar Methodist Girls' School (Primary)
- PLMGSS - Paya Lebar Methodist Girls' School (Secondary)
- PLQ - Paya Lebar Quarter
- PLS - Paya Lebar Square
- PLU - People Like Us, a gay equality lobby group
- PM - Prime Minister
- PMD - Personal Mobility Devices
- PMET - Professional, Manager, Executive and Technician
- PMO - Prime Minister's Office
- PNS - Police National Servicemen
- POBC - Police Officer Basic Course
- POFMA - Protection from Online Falsehoods and Manipulation Act 2019
- POSB - Post Office Savings Bank (now known as POSBank)
- PP - Public Prosecutor (see also "APP" and "DPP") or Parkway Parade
- PPHS - Parenthood Provisional Housing Scheme
- PR - Permanent resident
- PROGRESS - Providing Opportunities through Growth, Remaking Singapore for Success
- PRP - Private Residential Premise
- PS - Plaza Singapura
- PSA - Port of Singapore Authority (now known as PSA International)
- PSC - Public Service Commission
- PSD - Public Service Division
- PSI - Pollutant Standards Index
- PSLE - Primary School Leaving Examination
- PSP - Progress Singapore Party
- PSR - Pasir Ris
- PSV - MSF's Protective Service
- PT - Practical Test or Physical Training
- PTC - Public Transport Council
- PUB - Public Utilities Board
- PWD - Public Works Department
- PWS - Public Warning System
- PWM - Progressive Wage Model

=== Q ===
- QDL - Qualified Driving Licence
- QHPS - Qihua Primary School

=== R ===
- R & T - Rajah & Tann, a law firm
- RC - Residents' Committee
- RCR - Rest of Central Region
- RCS - Radio Corporation of Singapore
- RCY - Singapore Red Cross Youth
- REACH - Reaching Everyone for Active Citizenry@Home
- REIT - Real Estate Investment Trust
- REP - Renaissance Engineering Programme
- RGPS - Raffles Girls' Primary School
- RGS - Raffles Girls' School
- RI - Raffles Institution
- RIE - Research, Innovation and Enterprise
- RJ or RJC - Raffles Junior College
- RMBR - Raffles Museum of Biodiversity Research
- RMPS - Radin Mas Primary School
- ROM - Registry of Marriages
- ROMM - Registry of Muslim Marriages
- RP - Republic Polytechnic
- RRP - Recommended retail price
- RS - Rosyth School
- RSAF - Republic of Singapore Air Force
- RSN - Republic of Singapore Navy
- RSS - Riverside Secondary School or Republic of Singapore Ship
- RSS - Riding Theory Test
- RTS - Rapid Transit System
- RWS - Resorts World Sentosa
- RVHS - River Valley High School, Singapore
- RVM - Reverse Vending Machine
- RVRC - Ridge View Residential College, NUS

=== S ===
- SAC - Singapore Accreditation Council
- SACA - Singapore After-Care Association
- SAF - Singapore Armed Forces
- SAFRA - SAFRA National Service Association
- SAJC - St Andrew's Junior College
- SAL - Singapore Academy of Law
- SAM - Singapore Art Museum
- SAMH - Singapore Association for Mental Health
- SANA - Singapore Anti-Narcotics Association
- SAP - Special Assistance Plan
- SAR - Senior Assistant Registrar of the Supreme Court of Singapore
- SAS - Singapore American School
- SAT - Self-Assessment Tool
- SATS - Singapore Airport Terminal Services
- SAWL - Singapore Association of Women Lawyers
- SBF - Singapore Buddhist Federation or Singapore Business Federation
- SBI - State Bank of India
- SBM - Singapore Buddhist Mission
- SBS or SBST - SBS Transit
- SBW - Sembawang
- SBWR - Sungei Buloh Wetland Reserve
- SBYM - Singapore Buddhist Youth Mission
- SC - Senior Counsel or Singapore Citizen
- SCCCI - Singapore Chinese Chamber of Commerce and Industry
- SCELSE - Singapore Centre for Environmental Life Sciences Engineering (pronounced “cell-see”)
- SChO - Singapore Chemistry Olympiad
- SCDF - Singapore Civil Defence Force
- SCGS - Singapore Chinese Girls' School
- SCO - Singapore Chinese Orchestra
- SCS - Specialist Cadet School or Science Centre Singapore or Singapore Computer Systems
- SCT - Small Claims Tribunals
- SCWO - Singapore Council of Women's Organisations
- SDA - Singapore Democratic Alliance
- SDC - Sentosa Development Corporation
- SDJ - Senior District Judge
- SDN - Social Development Network (formerly SDU and SDS)
- SDO - Short Detention Order
- SDP - Singapore Democratic Party
- SDS - Special Discounted Shares
- SEAB - Singapore Examinations and Assessment Board
- SEC - Singapore Environment Council
- SERS - Selective En bloc Redevelopment Scheme
- SERT - Singapore Economic Resilience Taskforce
- SFA - Singapore Food Agency
- SFC - SkillsFuture Credit
- SFCCA - Singapore Federation of Chinese Clan Associations
- SFI - Singapore Food Industries
- SG - Solicitor-General
- SGAC - Singapore Arrival Card
- SGC - Singapore Gardeners' Cup
- SGDI - Singapore Government Directory
- SGF - Singapore Garden Festival
- SGH - Singapore General Hospital
- SGP - Singapore Green Plan
- SGSS - St. Gabriel's Secondary School or Serangoon Garden Secondary School
- SGX - Singapore Exchange
- SHHKCA - Singapore Hokkien Huay Kuan Cultural Academy
- SIA or SQ - Singapore Airlines
- SIA - Singapore Institute of Architects
- SICC - Singapore Island Country Club or Singapore International Chamber of Commerce
- SID - Security and Intelligence Division
- SILE - Singapore Institute of Legal Education
- SILS - Singapore Institute of Labour Studies
- SIM - Singapore Institute of Management
- SINDA - Singapore Indian Development Association
- SingCERT - Singapore Cyber Emergency Response Team
- SIO - Senior Investigation Officer
- SIT - Singapore Institute of Technology
- SJAB - St. John Ambulance Brigade
- SJI - St. Joseph's Institution
- SJII - St. Joseph's Institution International
- SJIJ - St. Joseph's Institution Junior
- SK - Sengkang
- SKH - Sengkang General Hospital
- SLA - Singapore Land Authority
- SLF - Singapore Labour Foundation
- SLO - Singapore Lyric Opera
- SLS - Sim Lim Square
- SLSS - Si Ling Secondary School
- SLT - Sim Lim Tower
- SMF - Singapore Manufacturers' Federation
- SMC - Single Member Constituency or Singapore Medical Council
- SMO - Singapore Mathematics Olympiad
- SMRT - SMRT Corporation
- SMSS - St. Margaret's Secondary School
- SMU - Singapore Management University
- SNB - Singapore Nursing Board
- SNEF - Singapore National Employers Federation
- SNO - Special Needs Officer
- SNOC - Singapore National Olympic Council
- SNPC - Singapore National Paralympic Council
- SOE - Spirit of Enterprise
- SOS - Samaritans of Singapore or (slang) struggling in silence
- SOTA - School of the Arts, Singapore
- SP - Singapore Polytechnic
- SPA - School-based Practical Assessment (for students taking GCE 'O' level)
- SPC - SingPost Centre or Singapore Pharmacy Council
- SPCA - Society for the Prevention of Cruelty to Animals
- SpexSG - Sport Excellence Singapore
- SPF - Singapore Police Force
- SPH - Singapore Press Holdings
- SPG - (slang) sarong party girl
- SPIN - Single Parents INformed, INvolved and INcluded
- SPRING - Standards, Productivity and Innovation Board
- SPS - Saint Patrick's School or Singapore Prison Service
- SPhO - Singapore Physics Olympiad
- SRCS - Singapore Red Cross Society
- SRJC - Serangoon Junior College (now merged with Anderson Junior College to form Anderson Serangoon Junior College)
- SRS - Supplementary Retirement Scheme
- SS - Social Studies
- SSA - Social Service Agency
- SSC - Singapore Sports Council or Singapore Swimming Club
- SSDC - Singapore Safety Driving Centre
- SSHSPH - Saw Swee Hock School of Public Health
- SSGS - Special Singapore Government Securities
- SSO - Singapore Symphony Orchestra
- SST - School of Science and Technology, Singapore or Singapore Standard Time
- ST - Singapore Technologies or The Straits Times or SingTel
- STAR - Special Tactics and Rescue
- STARiS/STARIS - SMRT Active Route Map Information System
- STB - Singapore Tourism Board
- ST Engg - Singapore Technologies Engineering
- STI - Straits Times Index
- STOMP - Straits Times Online Mobile Print
- STV or SH - StarHub (formerly StarHub TV or Singapore Cable Vision)
- SUSS - Singapore University of Social Sciences
- SUTD - Singapore University of Technology and Design
- SVPS - South View Primary School
- SWDA - Skills and Workforce Development Agency
- SYAS - San Yu Adventist School
- SYF - Singapore Youth Festival
- SYFC - Singapore Youth Flying Club
- SYOGOC - Singapore Youth Olympic Games Organising Committee
- SYSNMH - Sun Yat Sen Nanyang Memorial Hall
- SYT - Sweet Young Thing

=== T ===
- TA - Temasek Academy
- TADM - Tripartite Alliance for Dispute Management
- TB - Tuberculosis
- TBP - Tiong Bahru Plaza
- TCHS - The Chinese High School (now merged with Hwa Chong Junior College to form Hwa Chong Institution)
- TCMPB - Traditional Chinese Medicine Practitioners Board
- TCS - Television Corporation of Singapore
- TEL or TE - Thomson–East Coast MRT line
- TFR - Total fertility rate
- TH - Temasek Hall, NUS
- TIBS - Trans-Island Bus Services
- TJC - Temasek Junior College
- TKGS - Tanjong Katong Girls' School
- TKSS - Tanjong Katong Secondary School
- TM - Tampines Mall
- TMJC - Tampines Meridian Junior College
- TNRM - Trap-Neuter-Rehome/Release-Manage programme
- TMS - Temasek Secondary School
- TNS - Tao Nan School
- TNP - The New Paper
- TOC - The Online Citizen
- TOP - Temporary Occupancy Permit
- TOLQ - Temporary Occupation Licence Quarter
- TP - Temasek Polytechnic or Traffic Police
- TPOL - Triple P Online
- TPY - Toa Payoh
- TPG - Tanjong Pagar
- TPJC - Tampines Junior College (now merged with Merdian Junior College to form Tampines Meridian Junior College)
- TPS - Tampines Primary School
- TPDS - Traffic Police Driving Simulator
- TPSS - Tampines Secondary School
- TTC - Trinity Theological College, Singapore
- TTS - Tanglin Trust School; Tower Transit Singapore
- TTSH - Tan Tock Seng Hospital
- TSS - Tanglin Secondary School

=== U ===
- UAS - University of the Arts Singapore
- UEN - Unique Entity Number
- UOB - United Overseas Bank
- URA - Urban Redevelopment Authority
- UP - Usual Price
- UPA - Undesirable Publications Act
- USS - Universal Studios Singapore
- UWC or UWCSEA - United World College of South East Asia

=== V ===
- VEP - Vehicle Entry Permit
- VERS - Voluntary Early Redevelopment Scheme
- VIA - Values, Integrity, Action (replaces "CIP")
- VJC - Victoria Junior College
- VS - Victoria School
- VSS - Vegetarian Society (Singapore)
- VWO - Voluntary Welfare Organisation

=== W ===
- WDL - Woodlands, Singapore
- WDP - Woodlands Primary School
- WGS - Woodgrove Secondary School
- WongP - WongPartnership LLP, a law firm
- WP - Workers' Party of Singapore or Work Permit
- WPS - Woodgrove Primary School
- WQF - Workers' Quarters at Farms
- WS - White Sands
- WSG - Workforce Singapore
- WSH - Workplace, Safety, and Health
- WSS - Whitley Secondary School or Woodlands Secondary School
- WSSS - West Spring Secondary School
- WWP - Waterway Point
- WWSS - Westwood Secondary School

=== X ===
- XDD - Xiǎo Dì Di (小弟弟，literally 'little boy')
- XMM - Xiǎo Mèi Mèi (小妹妹，literally 'little girl')
- XHH - Xiǎo Hùn Hùn (小混混，literally 'young gangster')
- XS - Xiasuey (削衰，used as 'embarrassment' or 'cringe')
- XMS - Xinmin Secondary School

=== Y ===
- YCKSS - Yio Chu Kang Secondary School
- YHSS - Yuhua Secondary School
- YJC - Yishun Junior College (now merged with Innova Junior College to form Yishun Innova Junior College)
- YIJC - Yishun Innova Junior College
- YLL(SM) - Yong Loo Lin (School of Medicine)
- YP - Young Punk
- YSS - Yishun Secondary School
- YTSS - Yishun Town Secondary School
- YIS - Yishun
- YNC - Yale-NUS College
- YRSG - Yellow Ribbon Singapore

=== Z ===
- ZHPS - Zhenghua Primary School or Zhonghua Primary School
- ZHSS - Zhonghua Secondary School
- ZSS - Zhenghua Secondary School

== Abbreviations in the military ==
This is a list of abbreviations commonly used in the Singapore Armed Forces, including slang terms. They are often used in place of the expanded form of the words. Some abbreviations are similar to those used in other military. Other abbreviations may be identical to those used outside of military but with differing context.

=== People ===
==== Ranks ====
These ranks are arranged in descending order of seniority

===== Officers =====
Army and Air Force
- LG - Lieutenant General
- MG - Major General
- BG - Brigadier General
Navy
- VADM - Vice Admiral
- RADM - Rear Admiral

- COL - Colonel
- SLTC - Senior Lieutenant Colonel
- LTC - Lieutenant Colonel
- MAJ - Major
- CPT - Captain
- LTA - Lieutenant
- 2LT - Second Lieutenant
- OCT - Officer Cadet

===== Warrant officers =====
- CWO - Chief Warrant Officer
- SWO - Senior Warrant Officer
- MWO - Master Warrant Officer
- 1WO - First Warrant Officer (formerly Warrant Officer Class 1, "WO1" or "WOI")
- 2WO - Second Warrant Officer (formerly Warrant Officer Class 2, "WO2" or "WOII")
- 3WO - Third Warrant Officer

===== Specialists =====
- MSG - Master Sergeant
- SSG - Staff Sergeant
- 1SG - First Sergeant
- 2SG - Second Sergeant
- 3SG - Third Sergeant
- SGT - Sergeant (defunct – replaced by "1SG", "2SG" and "3SG")
- SCT - Specialist Cadet

===== Enlistees =====
- CFC - Corporal First Class
- CPL - Corporal
- LCP - Lance Corporal
- PFC - Private First Class
- PTE - Private
- REC - Recruit

==== Other Ranks ====
===== Military Domain Experts =====
- ME9 - Military Expert 9
- ME8 - Military Expert 8
- ME7 - Military Expert 7
- ME6 - Military Expert 6
- ME5 - Military Expert 5
- ME4 - Military Expert 4
- ME4(A) - Military Expert 4 (Apprentice)
- ME4(T) - Military Expert 4 (Trainee)
- ME3 - Military Expert 3
- ME2 - Military Expert 2
- ME1 - Military Expert 1
- ME1(T) - Military Expert 1 (Trainee)

===== SAF Volunteer Corps =====
- SV 4 - SAF Volunteer 4
- SV 3 - SAF Volunteer 3
- SV 2 - SAF Volunteer 2
- SV 1 - SAF Volunteer 1
- SV (T) - SAF Volunteer (Trainee)

==== Appointments and offices ====
- 2IC - Second-in-charge (see "IC")
- ASM - Army Sergeant Major
- BC - Battery Commander
- BDO - Battery Duty Officer
- BOS - Battalion Orderly Sergeant or Brigade Orderly Sergeant
- BSM - Battery Sergeant Major or Brigade Sergeant Major
- BSO - Battalion Signal Officer
- BQMS - or "BQ" - Battery Quartermaster Sergeant
- CAO - Chief Armour Officer
- CAF - Chief of Air Force
- CCO - Camp Commandant's Office
- CDF - Chief of Defence Force
- CDI - Chief of Digital and Intelligence Service
- CDO - Company Duty Officer
- CDS - Company Duty Sergeant
- CMC - Chief of Medical Corps
- CNV - Chief of Navy
- CO - Commanding Officer
- COA - Chief of Army
- COS - Company Orderly Sergeant
- CQMS - or "CQ" - Company Quartermaster Sergeant
- CSM - Company Sergeant Major
- DDO - Divisional Duty Officer
- DO - Duty Officer
- DOO - Duty Orderly Officer
- DOS - Duty Orderly Sergeant
- DS - Duty Sergeant
- DSM - Division Sergeant Major
- Dy S1 - Deputy Manpower Officer
- Dy S2 - Deputy Intelligence Officer
- Dy S3 - Deputy Training and Operation Officer
- Dy S4 - Deputy Logistics Officer
- FDO - Field Duty Officer
- FS - Fitness Specialist
- FSM - Formation Sergeant Major
- IC - (person) in command or in charge (see also "2IC")
- IO - Intelligence Officer or Investigating Officer
- MO - Medical Officer
- MTO - Military Transport Officer
- NO - Nursing Officer
- NCO - Non-Commissioned Officer (defunct – replaced by "Specialist")
- OC - Officer Commanding (Company Commander in other militaries)
- PC - Platoon Commander
- PS - Platoon Sergeant
- PSO - Principal Staff Officer
- PTI - Physical Training Instructor
- QM - Quartermaster - usually a commissioned officer or a senior warrant officer
- RQMS - Regimental Quartermaster Sergeant - usually a warrant officer in the SAF
- RSM - Regimental Sergeant Major
- S1 - Manpower Officer
- S2 - Intelligence Officer
- S3 - Training and Operation Officer
- S4 - Logistics Officer
- SDO - School Duty Officer (use is limited to training schools)
- SM - Sergeant Major
- SSM - School Sergeant Major
- WOSA - Warrant officers, specialists and airmen
- WOSE - Warrant officers, specialists and enlistees
- WOSPEC - Warrant officers and specialists

=== Units and organizations ===
- ADF - Army Deployment Force
- AFTC - Air Force Training Command
- AI - Artillery Institute
- AMB - Army Maintenance Base
- BB - Boys' Brigade
- BMTC - Basic Military Training Centre
- C4I - Command, Control, Communications, Computers, and Intelligence
- CAD - Combined Arms Division
- CDO - Singapore Commandos
- CMPB - Central Manpower Base
- CSSCOM - Combat Service Support Command
- CTI - Commando Training Institute
- DIS - Digital and Intelligence Service
- DISCOM - Division Support Command
- DSMB - Direct Support Maintenance Battalion (defunct, now renamed as "AMB" or Army Maintenance Base)
- DS Med Bn - Direct Support Medical Battalion
- DSSB - Direct Support Supply Battalion
- DSTA - Defence Science Technology Agency
- EOD - Explosive Ordnance Disposal
- FCC - Fitness Conditioning Centre
- FDS - Field Defence Squadron
- GDS - Singapore Guards
- GG - Girl Guide
- GB - Girls' Brigade
- ITI - Infantry Training Institute
- JID - Joint Intelligence Directorate
- JOPD - Joint Operations and Planning Directorate
- MES - Maintenance and Engineering Support
- MP - Military Police
- MMI - Military Medicine Institute
- MMRC - Multi-Mission Range Complex
- NCC - National Cadet Corps (Singapore)
- NCDCC - National Civil Defence Cadet Corps
- NDU - Naval Diving Unit (Singapore)
- NPCC - National Police Cadet Corps
- OCS - Officer Cadet School
- OETI - Ordnance Engineering Training Institute (Defunct: renamed to OES - OETI Engineering School)
- OSU - Open Source Unit
- PCC - Psychological Care Centre
- RCY - Singapore Red Cross Youth
- PDF - People's Defence Force
- RSAF - Republic of Singapore Air Force
- RSN - Republic of Singapore Navy
- SA - Singapore Artillery
- SAF - Singapore Armed Forces
- SAFAC - Singapore Armed Forces Ammunition Command
- SAFDB - Singapore Armed Forces Detention Barracks
- SAFPU - Singapore Armed Forces Provost Unit (defunct, reorganised into the Singapore Armed Forces Military Police Command)
- SAFMPC - Singapore Armed Forces Military Police Command
- SAFRA - Singapore Armed Forces Reservists' Association (the term "reservist" has generally been replaced by "Operationally Ready NSmen")
- SAFSA - Singapore Armed Forces Sports Association
- SAR - Singapore Armoured Regiment
- SCC - SAF Counselling Centre
- SCE - Singapore Combat Engineers
- SCS - Specialist Cadet School
- SFLS - Special Forces Leadership School
- SI - Signal Institute
- SIB - Singapore Infantry Brigade or Special Investigation Branch
- SIR - Singapore Infantry Regiment
- SISPEC - School of Infantry Specialists
- SMI - School of Military Intelligence
- SMM - School of Military Medicine (reorganised as SMTI in 2006)
- SMTI - SAF Medical Training Institute
- SOC - School of Commandos (defunct, reorganised into the Commando Training Institute)
- SOCC - Special Operations Command Centre
- SOF - Special Operations Force
- SOTAC - Special Operations Tactics Centre
- SOTC - Special Operations Training Centre
- SOTSC - Special Operations Support Centre
- SPT - School of Physical Training
- SRC - Singapore Red Cross
- TRADOC - Training Doctrine

=== Places ===
- 265 - formerly a hill in Marsiling with an elevation of 265 feet which was used for training; it has been levelled for urban development.
- ATEC - Army Training and Evaluation Center
- BCTC - Basic Combat Training Center
- JC1 - Jurong Camp I
- JC2 - Jurong Camp II
- PLC - Pasir Laba Camp
- PRC - Pasir Ris Camp
- SAFTI - Singapore Armed Forces Training Institute (term now defunct)
- SAFTI MI - SAFTI Military Institute

=== Weapons, vehicles and equipment ===
- A-veh - a heavy vehicle, such as an armoured vehicle
- APC - Armoured Personnel Carrier
- ATGM - Anti-tank guided missile
- AVLB - Armoured Vehicle Launched Bridge
- B-veh - non-"A-veh" vehicles, such as rovers and trucks
- FAD - first aid dressing
- FBO - full battle order (compare "SBO")
- FFR - (with reference to a land rover) fitted for radio
- FH88 - Field Howitzer 88
- FH2000 - Field Howitzer 2000
- GPMG - General Purpose Machine Gun – refers in particular to the FN MAG used in the Singapore Armed Forces
- HMG - Heavy machine gun
- IBA - Integrated body armour
- IFV - Infantry Fighting Vehicle
- LAW - Light Anti-tank Weapon
- LBS - Load Bearing System
- LBV - Load Bearing Vest
- LST - Landing Ship Tank
- MATADOR - Man Portable, Anti-Tank, Anti-Door Weapon
- MOP - Medic Operational Pouch (previously Medical Orderly Pouch)
- MOPP - Mission Oriented Protective Posture, referring to a set of protective gear for CBRE missions and toxic environments.
- RAI - Returnable Ammunition Item, usually referring to expended cartridges for live rounds or blanks that must be collected and accounted for after training exercises.
- RCK - rifle cleaning kit
- SAR - refers to SAR 21
- SAW - Section Automatic Weapon. A fully-automatic light machine gun, usually referring to the Ultimax 100, or the Colt Infantry Automatic Rifle.
- SBO - Standard (formerly Skeletal) Battle Order (compare "FBO")
- SSPH 1 or SSPH - Singapore Self-Propelled Howitzer 1 Primus
- TL - Troop lift - When soldiers ride on a five-ton truck from place to place (especially in military operations)

=== Slang ===
- FO - fall out; fuck off
- PK - from the hokkien word "Pang kang" which literally means end work.
- LOBO - left out of battle order (refers to a soldier who has not been assigned a fixed vocation)
- LLST - lan lan suck thumb, meaning to embrace the fact and continue
- NATO - no action, talk only
- Pikachu - from the hokkien expression "bai kah bai chew", meaning crippled
- SBC - simply boh chup – indifferent, not caring (from the abbreviation of the Singapore Broadcasting Corporation)
- WALI - walk around, look important
- ROC - relax one corner
- OTOT - own time own target
- RSAF - rarely seen after five. Also the acronym for the Republic of Singapore Air Force.
- SOC - siam one corner, that is, to hide somewhere in order to avoid meeting one's superiors, doing work, etc. (from the abbreviation of "Standard Obstacle Course")

=== Others ===
- 11B - SAF 11B, the military identity card, referring to the eleven pieces of basic information written.
- 1206 - SAF 1206, a form signed to acknowledge deductions made to a soldier's payroll for damaging or losing equipment, etc. (pronounced "twelve-O-six")
- 1211 - SAF 1211, an issue and receipt voucher for proof of receiving and issuing of goods.
- 302 - SAF 302, a form signed to declare own homosexual orientation (pronounced "three-O-two")
- 15A - SAF 15A, a temporary document used alongside a photo ID card and police report, in place of a lost or stolen 11B
- ACCT - Advanced Close Combat Training
- AI - Armoured Infantry troopers
- AOC - Advanced Obstacle Course
- ATP - Advanced Trainfire Package
- Attend B - Medical status that allows soldier to perform only light duties
- Attend C - Medical status that exempts soldier from all duties
- AWOL - Absent Without Official Leave
- BAC - Battle Assault Course
- BCCT - Basic Close Combat Training
- BER - Beyond economic repair
- BIBO - Book-in/book-out (book)
- BIC - Battle Inoculation Course
- BMT - Basic Military Training
- BRO - Battalion Routine Order
- BTP - Basic Trainfire Package
- BUA - Built-up area (see also "FIBUA")
- C3 - command, control and communication (pronounced "C-three" or "C-cube")
- CBRE - Chemical, Biological, Radiological and Explosive Defence Group
- CIS - Chartered Industries of Singapore
- CMTL - Centralised Motor Transport Line
- COC - Change of Command Parade
- CP - Command Post
- CQC - Combat Qualification Course
- CRO - Company Routine Orders
- CS - Combat Shoot
- CSB - Combat Skills Badge
- CST - Combat Survival Training
- DB - Detention barracks
- DIV - Division
- DOD - Date of disruption
- EVAC - Evacuation
- FATEP - Field Artillery Training Evaluation Phase
- FFE - fire for effect
- FFF - Fit For Firing certification
- FFI - Fitness For Instructions
- FIBUA - fighting in built-up area (see also "BUA")
- FO - Forward Observer, soldier who corrects artillery fire
- FOFO - Fighting on Fortified objectives
- FPF - final protective fire
- G50 - G50, a form submitted for security clearance in military or government sectors
- GLS - Ground Logistics Support
- HCC - High Confidence Course
- HOTO - Hand over take over
- IA - Immediate Action, a pre-trained drill for responding to a certain situation
- ICCT - Intermediate Close Combat Training
- ICT - In Camp Training (also simply known as in-camp)
- IFC - Individual Field Craft
- IMT - Individual Marksmanship Trainer
- IPPT - Individual Physical Proficiency Test
- IPT - Individual Physical Proficiency Test (IPPT) Preparatory Training Programme
- JCC - Jungle Confidence Course
- L/F - Live firing
- LD - Medical status that allows soldiers to perform only light duties
- LOA - Letter of authority/authorisation
- MUP - Make-Up Pay
- NAVEX - Navigation exercise, a military exercise in which soldiers must locate checkpoints within an area with only the aid of a map and compass, and within a stipulated time limit
- OOC - Out of Course
- OOT - Out of Training
- ORD - Operationally Ready Date (formerly "ROD")
- ORNS - Operationally Ready National Service
- PES - Physical Employment Status
- QI - Quarterly Inspection certification
- RMJ - Medical status that excuses soldiers from running, marching and jumping
- RO - Routine Orders
- ROD - Run Out Date (now "ORD")
- SAF100 - Order to Report for National Service
- SOC - Standard Obstacle Course
- SOL - Stoppage of leave
- TH - Technical Handling
- UFF - Unfit for firing
- VOC - Vocational Obstacle Course
- WH - White Horse marking in medical docket indicative of special treatment required

== Abbreviations in transport ==
As in most other major cities, abbreviations are commonly used in transport-related matters. The most prominent are the three-letter abbreviations of the expressways in Singapore; all, except two, end with the letter "E":

- AYE - Ayer Rajah Expressway
- BKE - Bukit Timah Expressway
- CTE - Central Expressway
- ECP - East Coast Parkway
- KJE - Kranji Expressway
- KPE - Kallang-Paya Lebar Expressway
- MCE - Marina Coastal Expressway
- NSC - North–South Corridor (formerly North-South Expressway)
- PIE - Pan Island Expressway
- SLE - Seletar Expressway
- TPE - Tampines Expressway

With the introduction of the Expressway Monitoring and Advisory System (EMAS) in 1998, LED signboards were installed along the expressways to display warning and other informational messages to road users. This led to the increased use of abbreviations, some of which are less common and not easily understood. The following are examples of abbreviations used in the EMAS:

- NTH RD - North Road
- STH RD - South Road
- (CCK) DR - (Choa Chu Kang) Drive
- TOWN HALL - Jurong Town Hall Road
- (TP) AVE 10 - (Tampines) Avenue 10
- LT - left
- RT - right
- AFT - after
- BEF - before
- LN - lane
- SH - shoulder

== See also ==
- Singlish
