= Yishun Innova Junior College =

Merged College in Singapore formed in 2019

Yishun Innova Junior College (YIJC)
- 义顺星烁初级学院; Maktab Rendah Yishun Innova

Location
- 3 Yishun Ring Road, Singapore 768675; 1°25′28.7″N 103°49′46.7″E

Information
- Former names: Yishun Junior College; Innova Junior College
- Type: Government
- Established: January 1986; 40 years ago (As Yishun Junior College)
- Session: Single-session
- School code: 0708
- Principal: Mark Gerald Minjoot
- Enrolment: 1400+
- Houses: Sagitar, Peirseus, Arius, Roquila, Kyra
- Colours: White, Red, Blue
- Website: yijc.moe.edu.sg

Yishun Innova Junior College (YIJC) is one of the 14 junior colleges in Singapore, offering two-year pre-university programmes for students who graduate from secondary schools after their O-level examinations. The two-year A-Level programme prepares students for education in local or foreign universities.

== History ==
=== Yishun Junior College ===
Yishun Junior College (YJC) started operations in January 1986, and was initially housed on the same premises as Yishun Secondary School and Yishun Town Secondary School, while its permanent campus was being built. The campus was completed in December 1986 and was officially declared open by Parliamentary Secretary for Education Tang Guan Seng on 28 May 1988.

YJC was listed as one of the top-ten value added junior colleges in 2005 and 2006, and attained the gold academic value-added award for three consecutive years between 2007 and 2009.

=== Innova Junior College ===
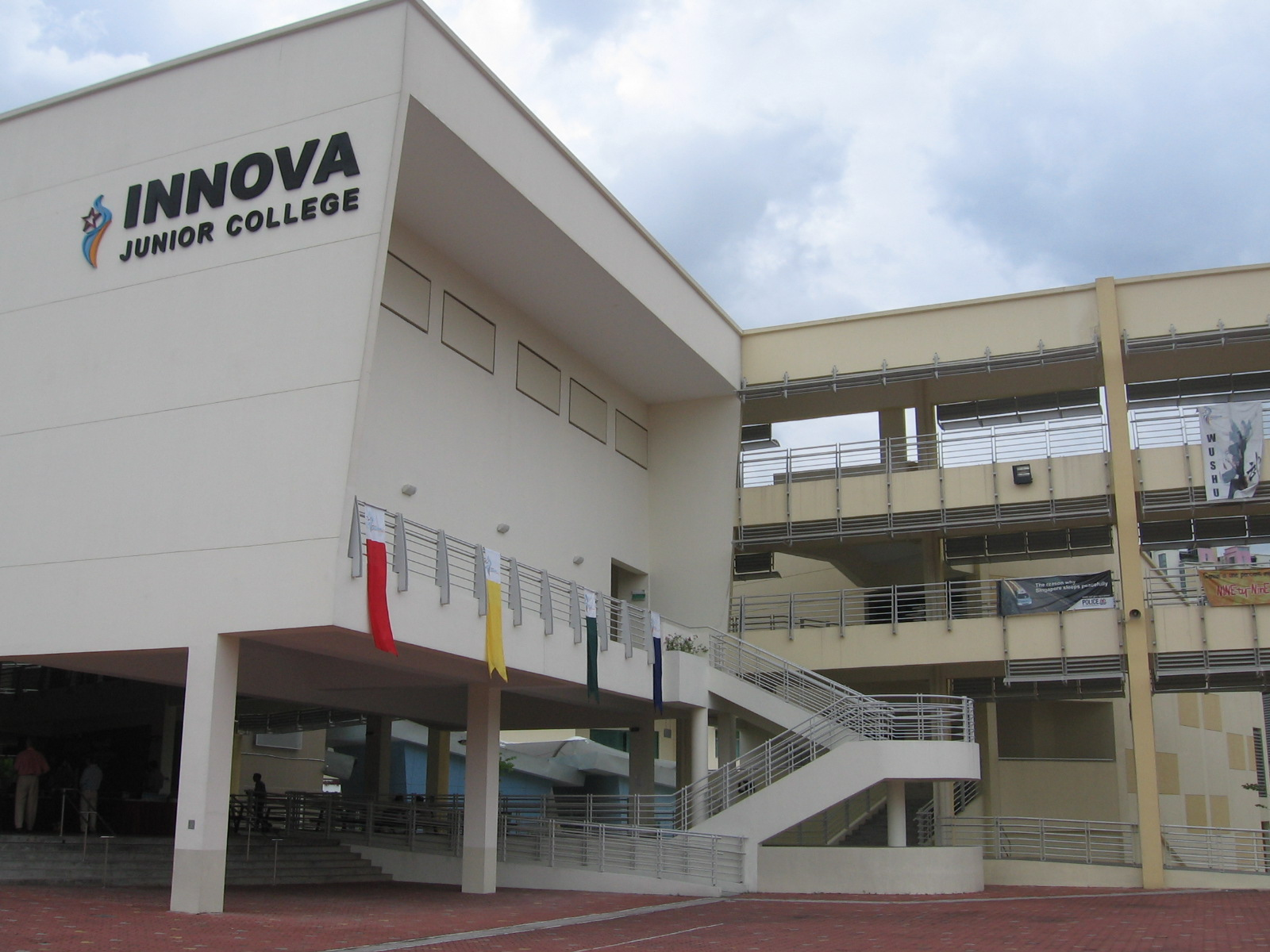
Innova Junior College

Innova Junior College crest

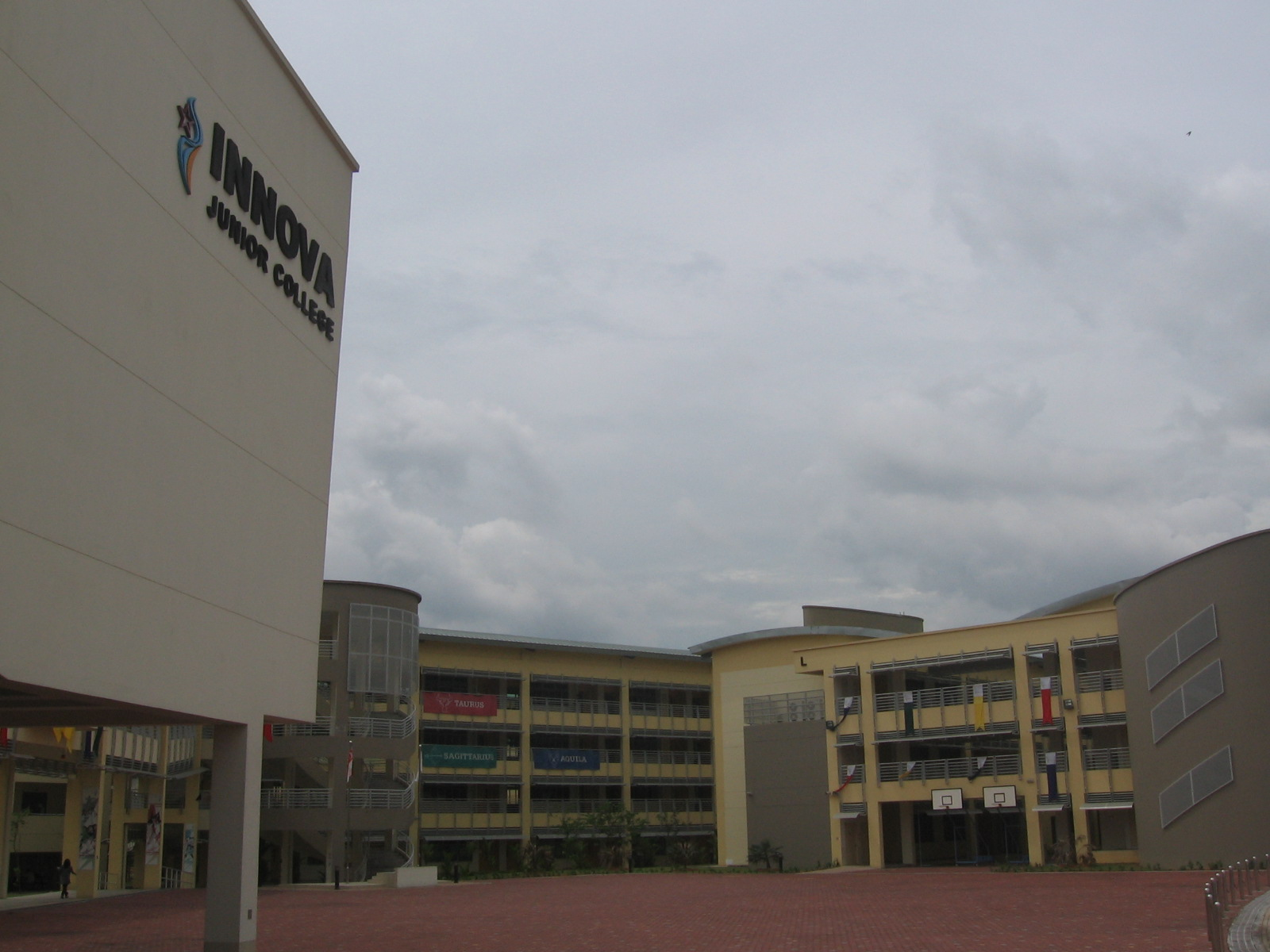
Innova Junior College, 2007

Innova Junior College was the third junior college to be established past the millennium after Pioneer Junior College and Meridian Junior College, and received the first cohort of students to its new campus in January 2005. The college was officially declared open by Dr. Mohamad Maliki Bin Osman, then Parliamentary Secretary, Ministry of National Development on 2 February 2007. The mission of the college then was "to nurture leaders and advocates with the passion to serve with honour and humility."

Innova Junior College was accorded the Centre of Excellence for New Media in February 2007, taking on dual roles as a research centre and a new media centre. The alumni association of Innova Junior College was officially registered as a non-profit organisation in 2015.

==== School name ====
"Innova" derives from the word "Nova" which means new in Latin and also "supernova" which means blazing star.

==== House system ====
The House System at Innova Junior College aims to promote espirit de corps, leadership and responsibility among students. There are four houses, each representing a constellation. The first letter of the name of each house forms the acronym "STAR", a key symbol in the college badge.

The four houses are

- Sagittarius (Green)
- Taurus (Red)
- Aquila (Blue)
- Rasalas (Yellow)

Students represent their houses in academic, sporting and cultural activities and earn House Points. An Overall Challenge Trophy is awarded to the House with the most points annually.

From 2015, the allocation of Year 1 students to houses was changed to a class-based system from the previous system of having students across different houses in each class. Each House is led by a House Captain, a Year 2 student, who leads the respective House Committee.

==== Anthem ====
The college anthem of IJC is entitled, Ad Astra, meaning "to the stars". It was written by Singapore composer Dick Lee as pro bono service in 2005. Lyrics were written by a teacher at Innova Junior College, Mdm Chitrakala Arumugam, in 2006.

=== Merger with Innova Junior College ===
On 20 April 2017, it was announced that YJC would merge with Innova Junior College (IJC), with the merged school located at the current campus of YJC. This was in light of the declining cohort sizes since 2014, which was attributed to the fall in Singapore's birth rate. The class of 2018 was the last graduating batch of Yishun Junior College students, with 2019 being the year that Yishun Junior College ceased operations.

On 11 January 2018, it was announced that the new college would be named Yishun Innova Junior College, with Innova Junior College's principal Mr Michael De Silva being the new principal.

YIJC will move to the campus used by IJC once upgrading works have been completed. The upgrading is slated for completion in 2027 and operations at the new site are set to commence in January 2028.

== Principal ==
=== YJC ===
Name of Principal	Years served
Francis Wu	1986–1992
Mohd Bin Said	1993–1997
Choy Say Chin	1998–2001
Ng-Gan Lay Choon	2002–2007
Koh Teck Siew	2008–2015
Edelweis Neo	2016–2018

=== IJC ===
Name	Years served
Yeo Hong Mui	2005-2009
Marian Chia Siew Yong	2010–2012
Michael de Silva	2013–2019

=== YIJC ===
Name of Principal	Years served
Michael de Silva	2019–2025
Mark Minjoot	2026–Present

== Co-Curricular Activities ==
Yishun Junior College made sporting history in 1989 when its rugby team, formed a year before, finished runner-up to Saint Andrew's Junior College in the national school tournament. In the following year, Yishun Junior College was crowned champion by beating Raffles Junior College in the final. The debate team of 1989 beat Hwa Chong Junior College and National Junior College in earlier rounds, moving to defeat Catholic Junior College in the finals. Its clubs and societies have secured awards in the Singapore Youth Festival Central Judging 2011.

== Leadership (RaDiAL) ==
The RaDiAL Leadership Development Structure (RLDS), reviewed in 2016, encapsulates the leadership training and experiential learning opportunities for YJC, now YIJC students. All students will have a place in one of twelve leadership groups.

== Achievements ==
IJC was recognised by the Ministry of Education, Singapore as a Centre of Excellence for New Media and New Media Arts. Innova Junior College also offers the Singapore Ministry of Education Malay Language Elective Programme.

== Notable alumni ==
=== Yishun JC ===
- Celest Chong – actress
- Margaret Lee – actress
- Patricia Mok – actress
- Priyadarshini - playback singer

== See also ==
- Education in Singapore
