= Yishun Town Secondary School =

- 毅道中学; Sekolah Menengah Yishun Town

Location
- 6 Yishun Street 21, Singapore 768610; Singapore

Information
- Type: Government-aided; Autonomous co-educational
- Motto: We Will Excel
- Established: 1986; 40 years ago
- Session: Single Session
- School code: 3045
- Principal: Koh Chee Hui
- Enrolment: Approx. 1,200
- Colour: Blue Yellow
- Website: yishuntownsec.moe.edu.sg

Yishun Town Secondary School (YTSS) is a co-educational government autonomous secondary school in Yishun, Singapore.

== History ==
The school was first established in 1986, originally sharing its premises with Yishun Secondary School and Yishun Junior College. In 1988, the school moved into a new S$8.1 million campus along Yishun Street 21 which they share an artificial football field with the primary school next door, Xishan Primary.

== Notable alumni ==
- Kelly Poon: Mandopop singer; Female winner, Project SuperStar, MediaCorp TV Channel U
- Hazlina Halim: News reader, MediaCorp Suria; Deejay, Ria 89.7FM

== Gallery ==
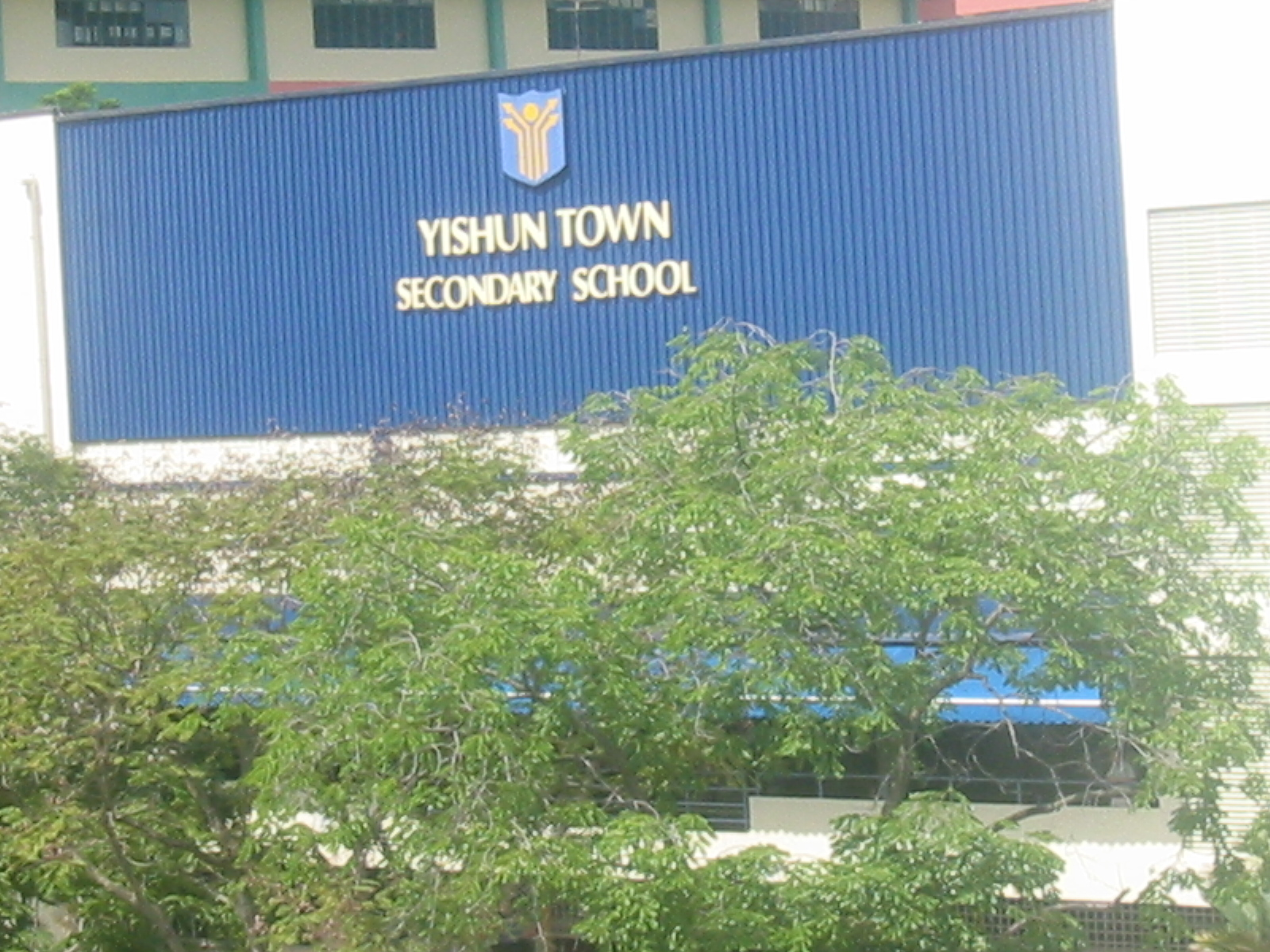
The old school building and its facade (1986-2005)

In between the upper and lower secondary classroom blocks in the holding campus.(2006-2007)

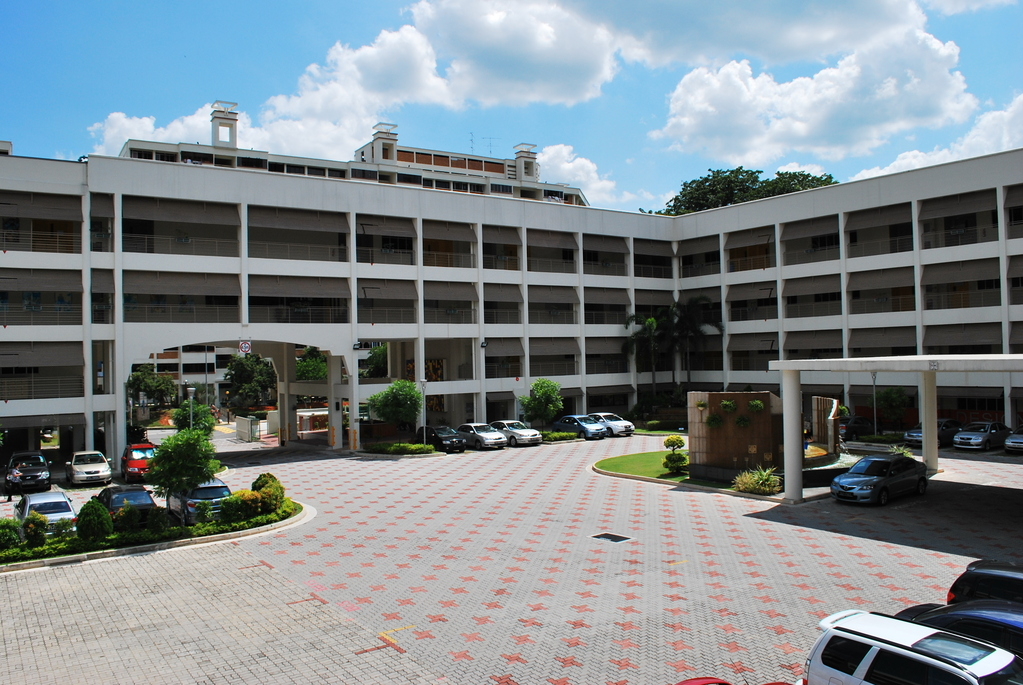
The courtyard of the current campus
