= Yishun Secondary School =

Government school in Singapore

- 义顺中学; Sekolah Menengah Yishun
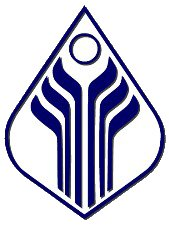

Location
- 4 Yishun Street 71, Singapore 768516; 1.4281°N 103.8288°E

Information
- Type: Government
- Motto: We seek, We strive, We soar
- Established: 1986; 40 years ago
- Session: Single
- School code: 3020
- Principal: Regina Lee
- Color: Blue White
- Website: http://www.yishunsec.moe.edu.sg/

Yishun Secondary School (YSS) is a co-educational government secondary school in Yishun, Singapore. Located at 4 Yishun Street 71, YSS is the first school to establish the Applied Learning Programme (ALP) in Sonic Arts.

== History ==
The school was originally opened in 1986, with its original school building completed in September 1985.

From January to March 1986, the building housed Yishun Secondary School, as well as Yishun Town Secondary School and Yishun Junior College. YSS and YTSS then shifted to YTSS on 29 March 1986.

Leong Kah Chong was appointed as YSS's first principal on 1 December 1986. Following that, YSS shifted back it to its existing building on 17 December 1986. The school was officially opened by Koh Lip Lin, Member of Parliament for Nee Soon, on 19 August 1988.

Soh Guan Ba was appointed as YSS's second principal in December 1995. YSS became single session after the completion of a new extension block in 1999, with Ow Chiong Hoo appointed as the third principal the following year in December 2000.

In June 2002, the school commenced the "Programme for Rebuilding and Improving Existing schools" (PRIME) In the same year, Goh Choon Leng was appointed as the fourth principal of YSS.

In 2006, YSS celebrated its twentieth anniversary and published "My Yishun: Recounting, Reflecting, Reminiscing". In December 2008, Ng Ngoing Keng was appointed the fifth principal of YSS.

In 2011, the YSS Heritage Walk was officially opened along with YSS's inaugural Arts Extravaganza.

Ng Shok Yan was appointed as YSS's sixth principal in December 2014. YSS celebrated its 30th anniversary in 2016 and launched the Annual Mass Run in 2017.

On 24 October 2017, YSS also broke a record of conducting the Largest Kickboxing Pad Work Session in Singapore with 120 students equipped with gloves and pads.

To celebrate its 32nd Anniversary, YSS broke another record of the Largest Logo made out of colouring books on 29 March 2018. With the logo measuring at 6.9 metres by 9.5 metres, the colouring books were then given to the elderly residents of Sree Narayana Mission as a community service.

In 2025, Yishun Secondary School installed a gallery named the Yishun Gallery, with the purpose of educating students about the past history of Nee Soon, from being a rural village to becoming a developed town with a proper town plan namely, the Yishun Town Plan first being developed in the 1980s, the school and the development of communities in Yishun, how the HDB flats developed in the 1980s versus the BTOs now jointly served and met different requirements as well as fulfilled different purposes due to the development of differing needs of residents/people over time.
