= Transport in Singapore =

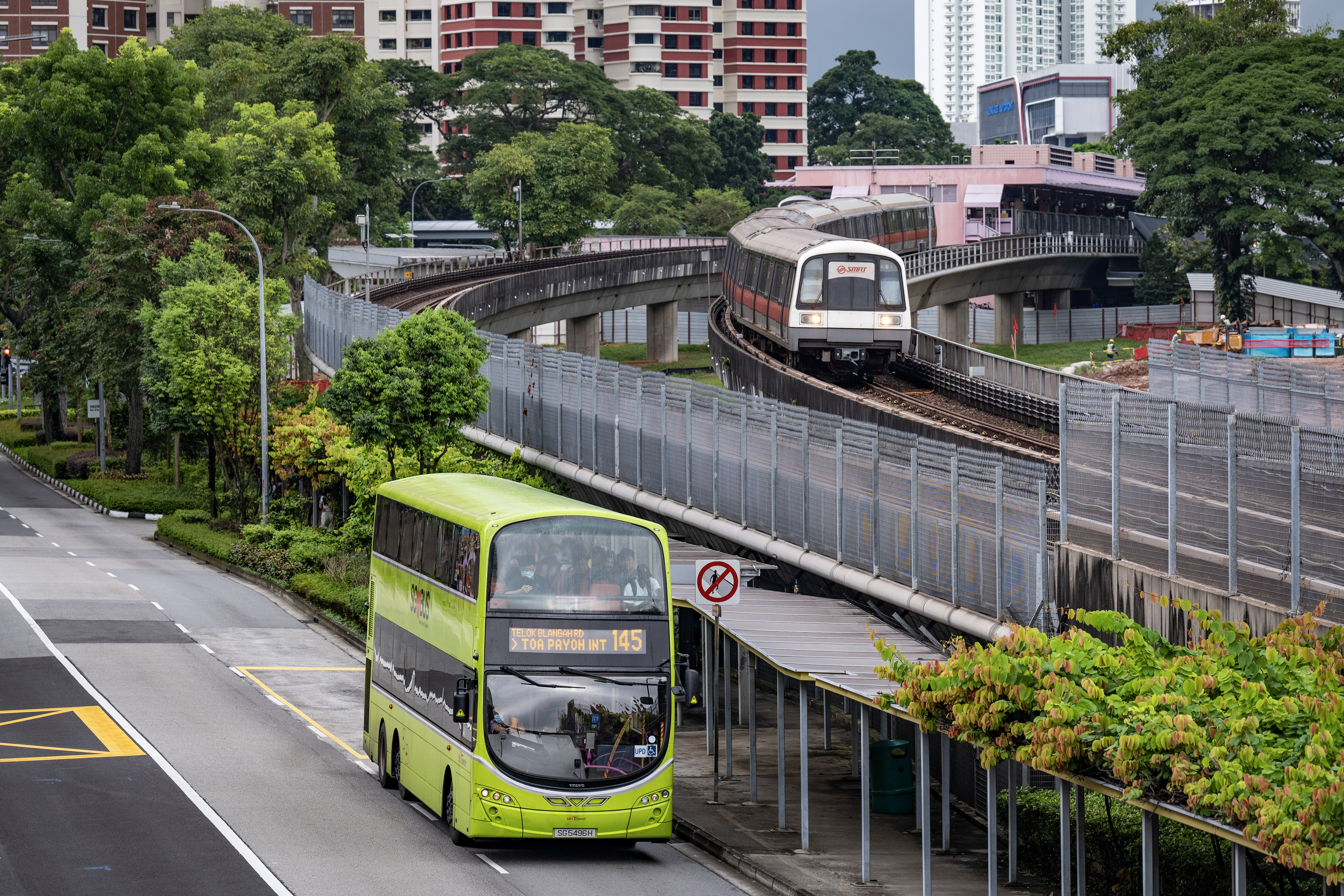
Buses and trains are some of the common modes of transport in Singapore.

Transport in Singapore is predominantly land-based, with a comprehensive network of roads making many parts of the city-state, including islands such as Sentosa and Jurong Island, accessible. The road network is complemented by a robust rail system consisting of the Mass Rapid Transit (MRT) and the Light Rail Transit (LRT), which cover the length and width of Singapore and serve a few neighbourhoods respectively. The main island of Singapore is also connected to other islands via ferryboat services. Furthermore, the city-state maintains strong international connections through two bridges linking it to Malaysia – the Causeway and the Second Link – and the Singapore Changi Airport, a major aviation hub in Asia.

Singapore's transport system is globally recognized for its reliability, efficiency and effectiveness. According to McKinsey's Urban Transportation report, it ranks as the world's best overall, excelling in five criteria: availability, affordability, efficiency, convenience, and sustainability. A study by London consulting firm Credo further highlights the cost-efficiency of Singapore's public transport networks, with integrated multi-modal (bus and train) single-journey regular trunk adult card-based fares ranging from S$0.99 to S$2.26. The Monthly Travel Pass, offering unlimited bus and train rides, is set at S$128 per month.

Public transport, encompassing public buses and the MRT and LRT rail networks, is the most common mode of transportation within the city-state and is far better developed than in the other ASEAN member states. The Land Transport Authority (LTA) fully integrates public transport, with state ownership and public financing of the public infrastructure and public capital assets of railways and buses. The operation and maintenance of these systems are tendered to bidding operator companies on contract.

Private transport, including cars, motorcycles, and commercial vehicles, is less commonly used due to the country's limited land space and dense population. The LTA has controlled and limited the private vehicle population through the Vehicle Quota System (VQS) ownership market-based license auctions since 1990. High taxes, such as the Certificate of Entitlement (COE) and Additional Registration Fee (ARF), make private vehicle ownership prohibitively expensive, leading to Singapore's reputation as the most expensive country in the world to own a car.

In recent years, Singapore has emerged as a preferred location for the testing and development of autonomous vehicles.

== Road transport ==
=== Buses ===
Public buses in Singapore.

Bus transport forms a significant part of public transport in Singapore, with over 4.0 million rides taken per day on average as of 2019. There are more than 365 scheduled bus services, operated by SBS Transit, SMRT Buses, Tower Transit Singapore and Go-Ahead Singapore. There are also around 5,800 buses, most of which are single-deck and double-deck, and a small minority of articulated buses and minibuses currently in active passenger service.

Since 2016, the Land Transport Authority regulates the public bus service standards and owns relevant assets whereas bus operators bid for operating bus services via competitive tendering, under its Bus Contracting Model.

=== Taxis and PHVs ===
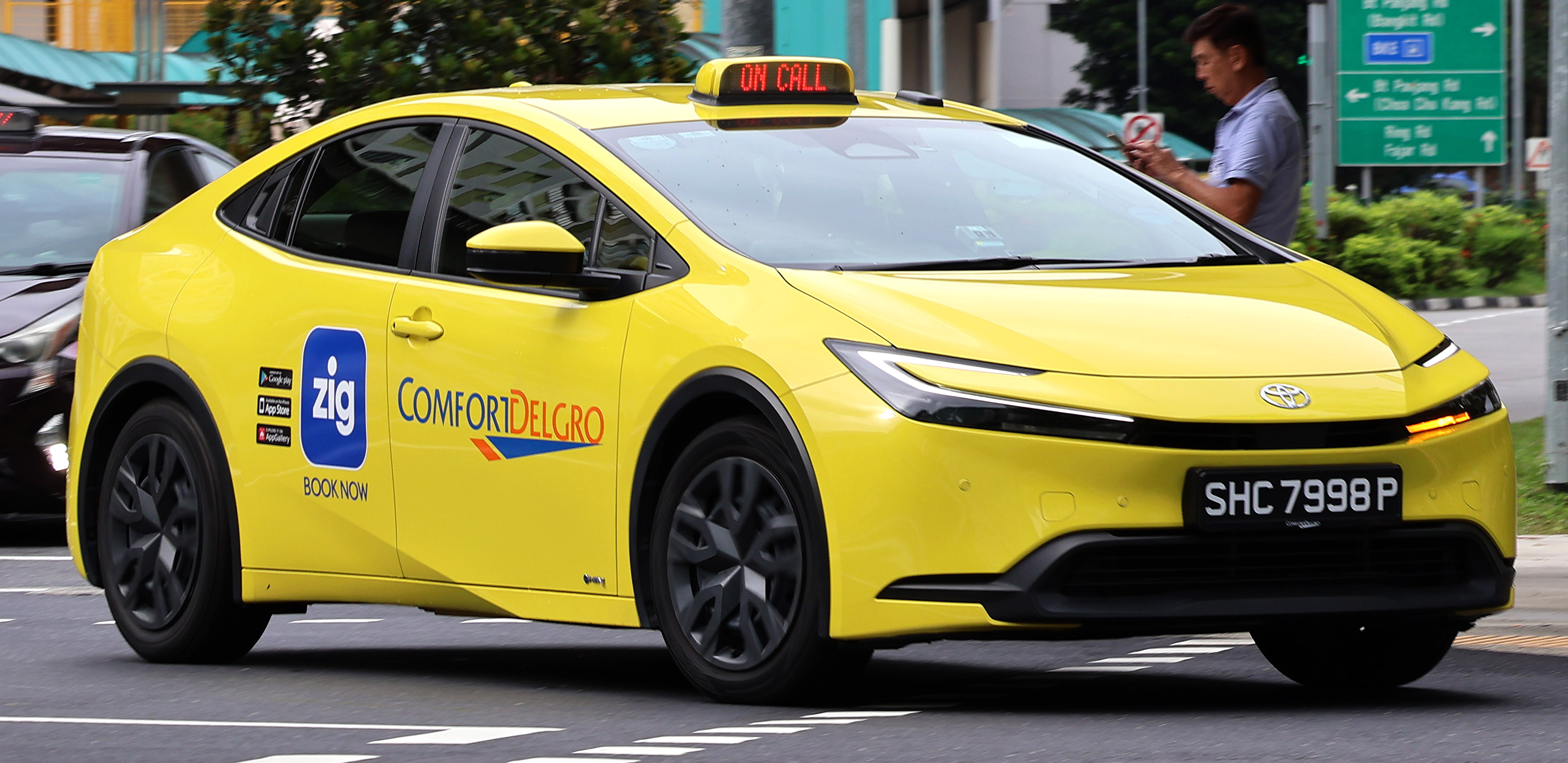
A Toyota Prius taxi operated by ComfortDelgro

Taxis and private hire vehicles (PHV) are a popular form of transport, with fares considered low compared to those in most cities in developed countries. Starting rates were $3.20 - $3.90. As of March 2019, the taxi and private hire car population has been increased to 83,037.

In Singapore, taxis can be flagged down at any time of the day along any public road outside of the Central Business District (CBD), while private hire cars can only be booked via ridesharing apps.

=== Private cars ===
As of 2018, there was a total of 957,006 motor vehicles in Singapore, with 509,302 of them being private cars.

Private transport (cars, motorcycles, commercial vehicles) is less commonly used as due to limited land space of the country. The Land Transport Authority (LTA) has limited and controlled the population of privately owned vehicles in the country through the Vehicle Quota System (VQS) ownership market-based license auctions since 1990. As a result, private vehicles are prohibitively expensive and Singapore is known to be most expensive country in the world to own a car. Prospective private vehicle owners are required to place a bid for a Certificate of Entitlement (COE) sold under auction (valid for ten years, as of May 2024; COEs are priced at more than S$92,700 for CAT A cars [below 97bhp], S$105,689 for bigger CAT B cars [above 97bhp], S$72,001 for prospective commercial vehicle owners and more than S$9,311 for prospective motorcycle owners) and pay the Additional Registration Fee (ARF) tax imposed at 100-320% of the open market value (OMV) of the vehicle, among other fees. As a result of the aforementioned taxes, on-the-road car prices in Singapore are approximately five times the on-the-road car prices in Western countries.

From 2025, new diesel cars were not allowed to be registered while new cars have to be of cleaner-energy models, including electric, hybrid or hydrogen fuel cell cars, from 2030.

=== Roads and expressways ===
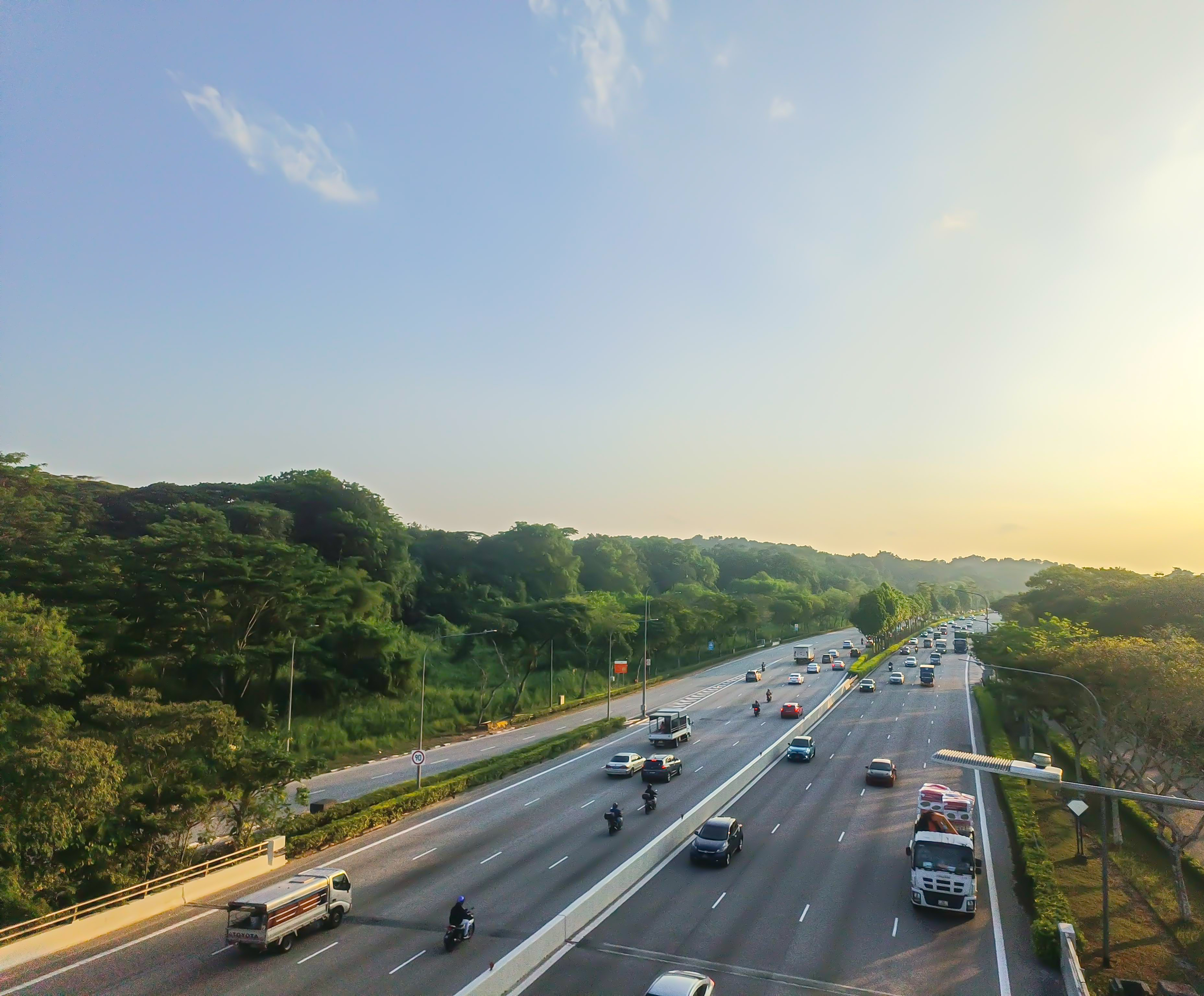
A section of Seletar Expressway

Singapore pioneered congestion pricing (the market-based usage management of public roads to reduce congestion at specific times within the city centre and certain expressways), with the Singapore Area Licensing Scheme, which has since been replaced with the Electronic Road Pricing, a form of electronic toll collection.

- Total length of expressways: 164 kilometres (102 mi)
- Total length of major arterial roads: 576 kilometres (358 mi)
- Total length of collector roads: 704 kilometres (437 mi)
- Total length of local access roads: 2,056 kilometres (1,278 mi) (as of 2017)

Traffic drives on the left which is typical in Commonwealth countries.

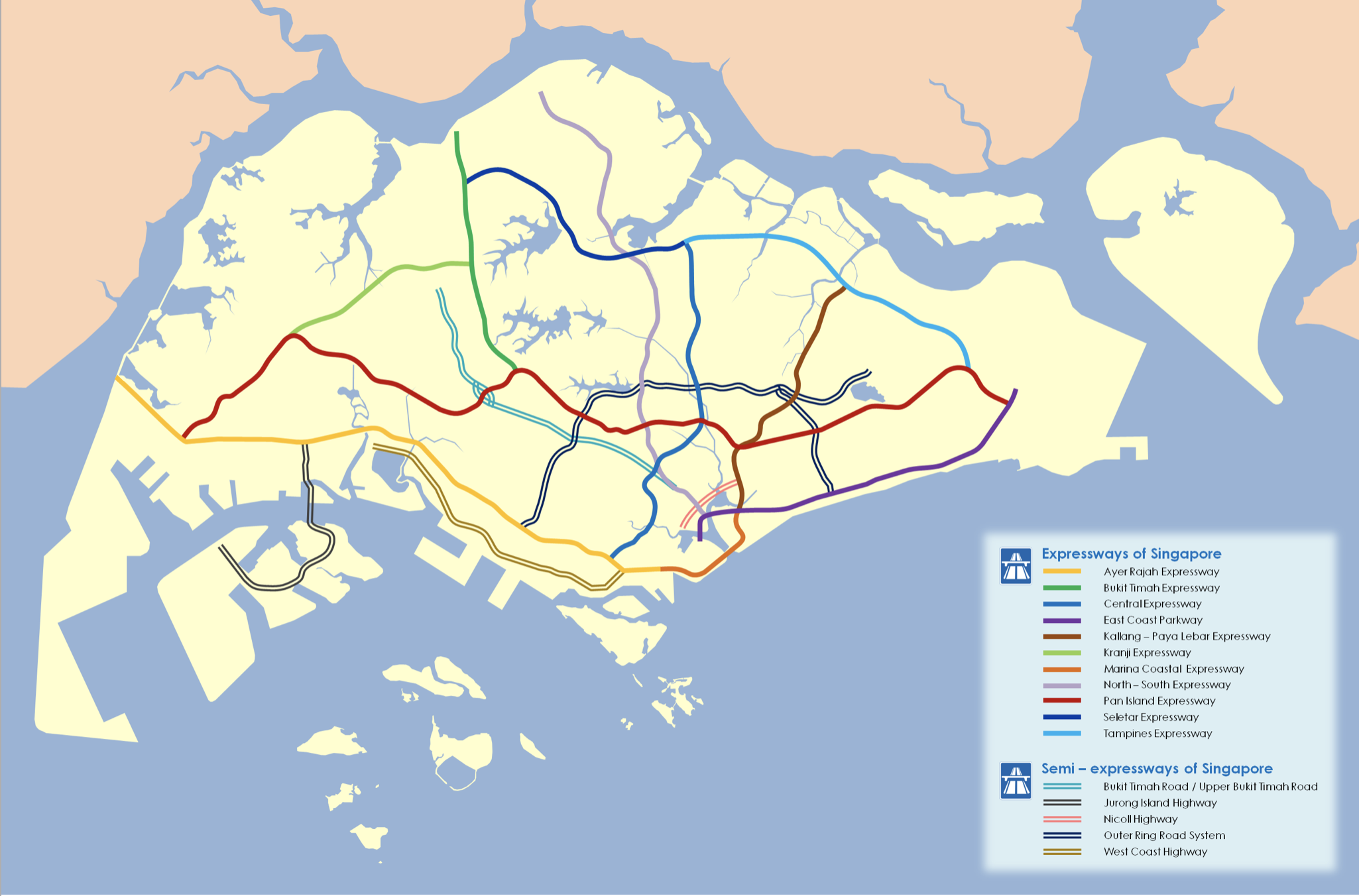
All expressways, plus the semi-expressways in Singapore

The planning, construction and maintenance of the road network is fully conducted by the Land Transport Authority (LTA), and this extends to expressways in Singapore. These form key transport arteries between the distinct towns and regional centres as laid out in Singapore's urban planning, with the main purpose of allowing vehicles to travel from satellite towns to the city centre and vice versa in the shortest possible distance. These expressways include:

- Ayer Rajah Expressway (AYE)
- Bukit Timah Expressway (BKE)
- Central Expressway (CTE)
- East Coast Parkway (ECP)
- Marina Coastal Expressway (MCE)
- Kallang–Paya Lebar Expressway (KPE)
- Kranji Expressway (KJE)
- Pan Island Expressway (PIE)
- Seletar Expressway (SLE)
- Tampines Expressway (TPE)
- North–South Corridor (scheduled opening in 2027)

The influence of expressways on Singapore's transport policy developed shortly after independence during the history of Singapore because of frequent traffic congestion in the Central district. The aim was to encourage residential development in other parts of the island and give residents in these new "satellite towns" a convenient link between their homes and their workplaces (which were mostly situated around the city centre).

=== Causeway and link bridge ===
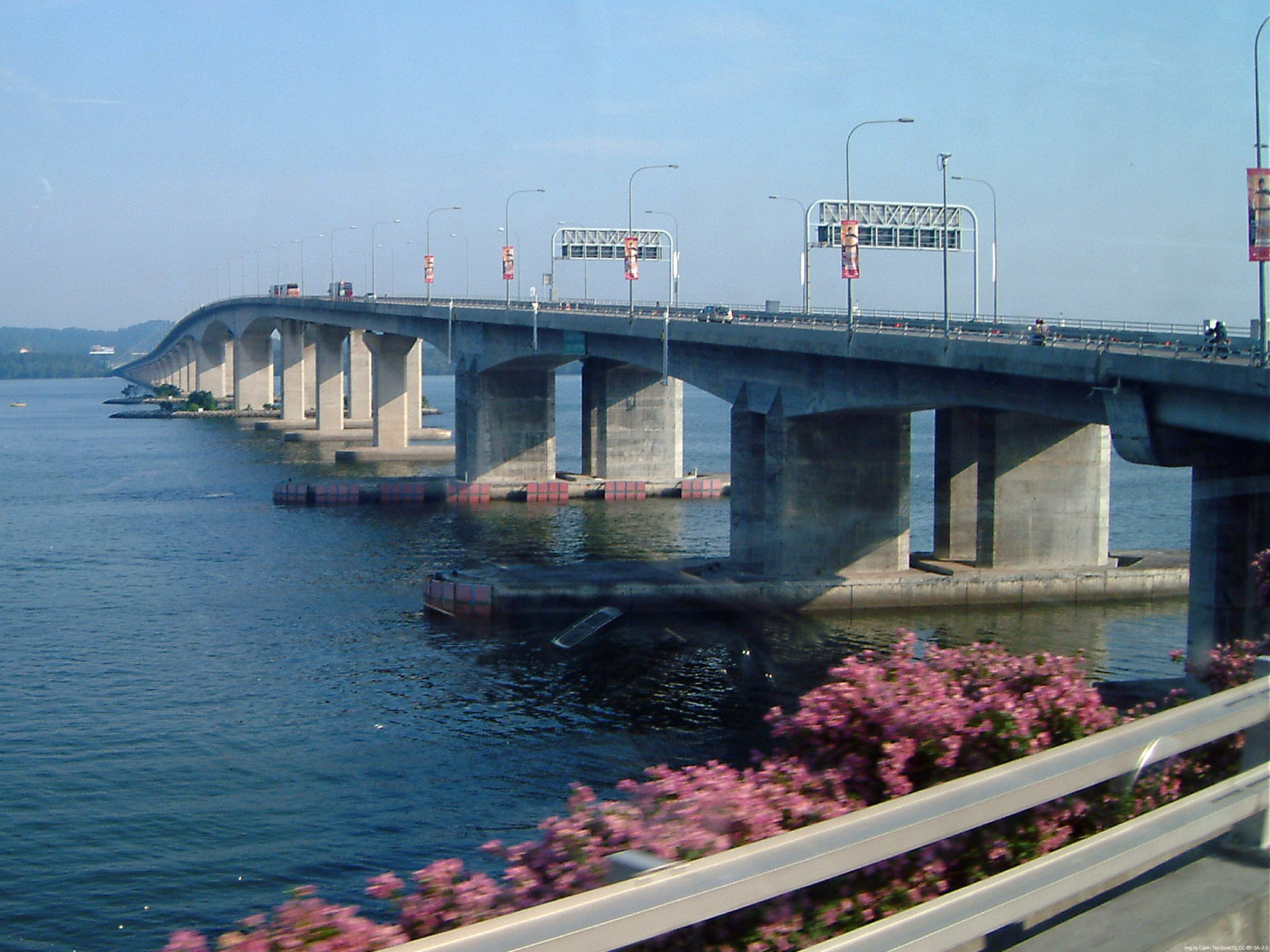
Tuas Second Link

Singapore has two land links to Malaysia. The Johor–Singapore Causeway, built in the 1920s to connect Johor Bahru in Johor, Malaysia to Woodlands in Singapore, carries a road and a railway line. The Tuas Second Link, a bridge further west, was completed in 1996 and links Tuas in Singapore to Tanjung Kupang in Johor.

=== Trishaws ===
Before World War II, rickshaws were an important part of urban public transportation. In 1947 they were banned on humanitarian grounds, and replaced by trishaws (cycle rickshaws).

Usage of trishaws as a means of transportation had died out by 1983. Some trishaws then served as tourist attractions, taking tourists for a ride around the downtown district. Individual trishaw rider licenses were last issued in 2001, while the last licensed operator of trishaw tours, Trishaw Uncle, ended its contract with the Singapore Tourism Board at the end of May 2023. As of April 2024, there are no commercial trishaw services operating in Singapore.

=== Autonomous vehicles ===
An autonomous shuttle service operated by the Chinese autonomous shuttle company WeRide began operations in June 2024 at Resorts World Sentosa. It became fully driverless in July 2025, such that the shuttles no longer required a safety operator to be on board while in service.

On 1 April 2026, the autonomous shuttle service in Punggol, operated by Ai.R (Grab and WeRide) began public ride operations. 2 main routes and 1 mini route opened to the public. Another route, operated by ComfortDelGro and Pony.ai, began by-invite community rides on 7 April 2026 and will be open for public rides on 22 Jun 2026.

== Rail transport ==
=== Mass Rapid Transit (MRT) ===
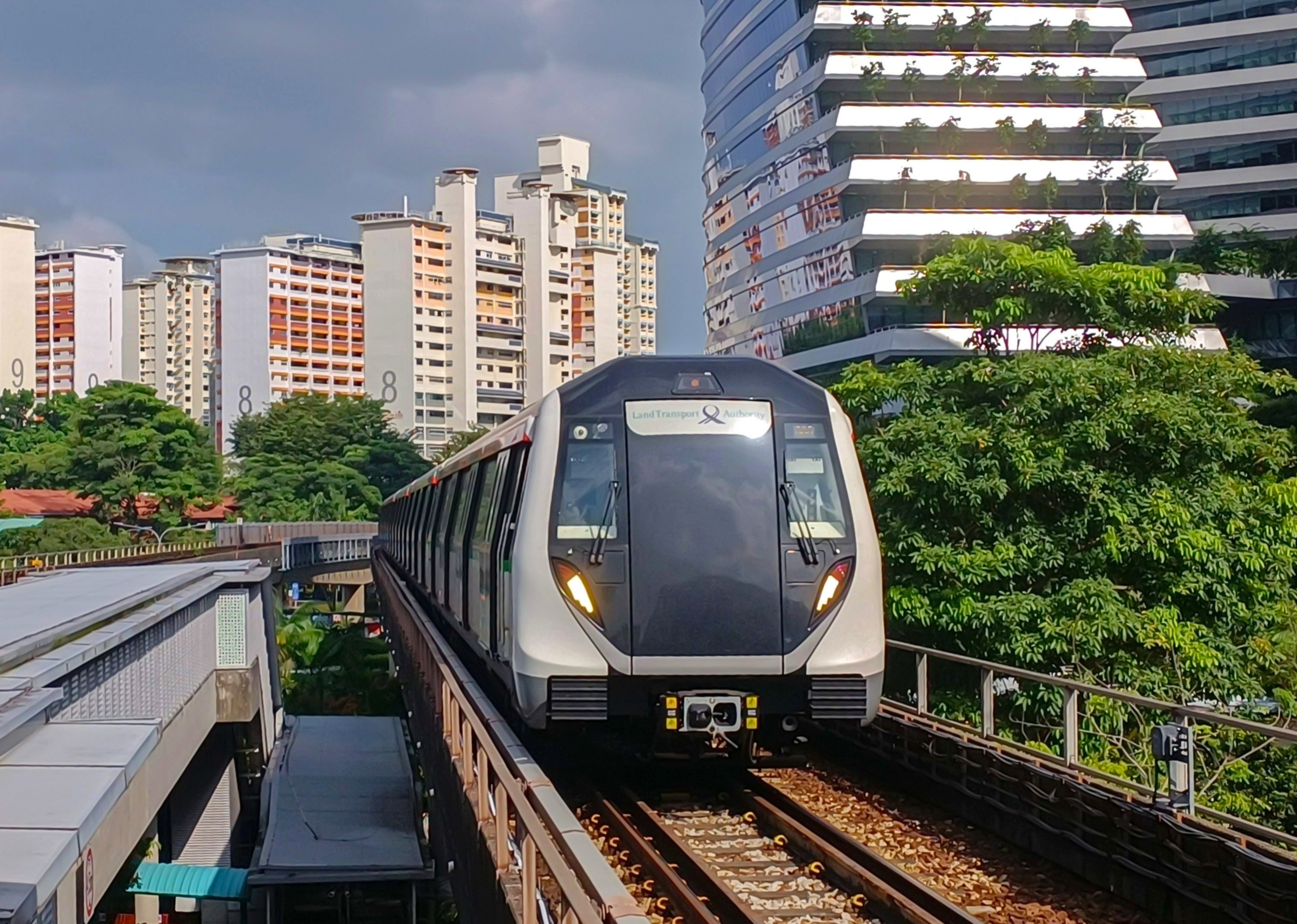
Mass Rapid Transit

The Mass Rapid Transit, which opened in 1987, is a heavy rail metro system that serves as the major backbone of Singapore's public transport system along with public buses; as of the end of 2025, the network has a length of 242.5 kilometres (150.7 mi) and, as of November 2022, 166 stations. The Land Transport Authority, the main planning authority of the MRT, plans to provide a more comprehensive rail transport system by expanding the rail system to a total of 360 km (223.69 mi) by the year 2030, with eight in ten households living within a 10-minute walking distance of an MRT station.

The current MRT network consists of six main lines: the North–South Line, East–West Line, Circle Line and Thomson–East Coast Line operated by SMRT Trains (SMRT Corporation) and the North East Line and Downtown Line operated by SBS Transit. Two more lines, the Jurong Region Line and the Cross Island Line, will open in stages from 2027 and 2030 respectively.

=== Light Rail Transit (LRT) ===
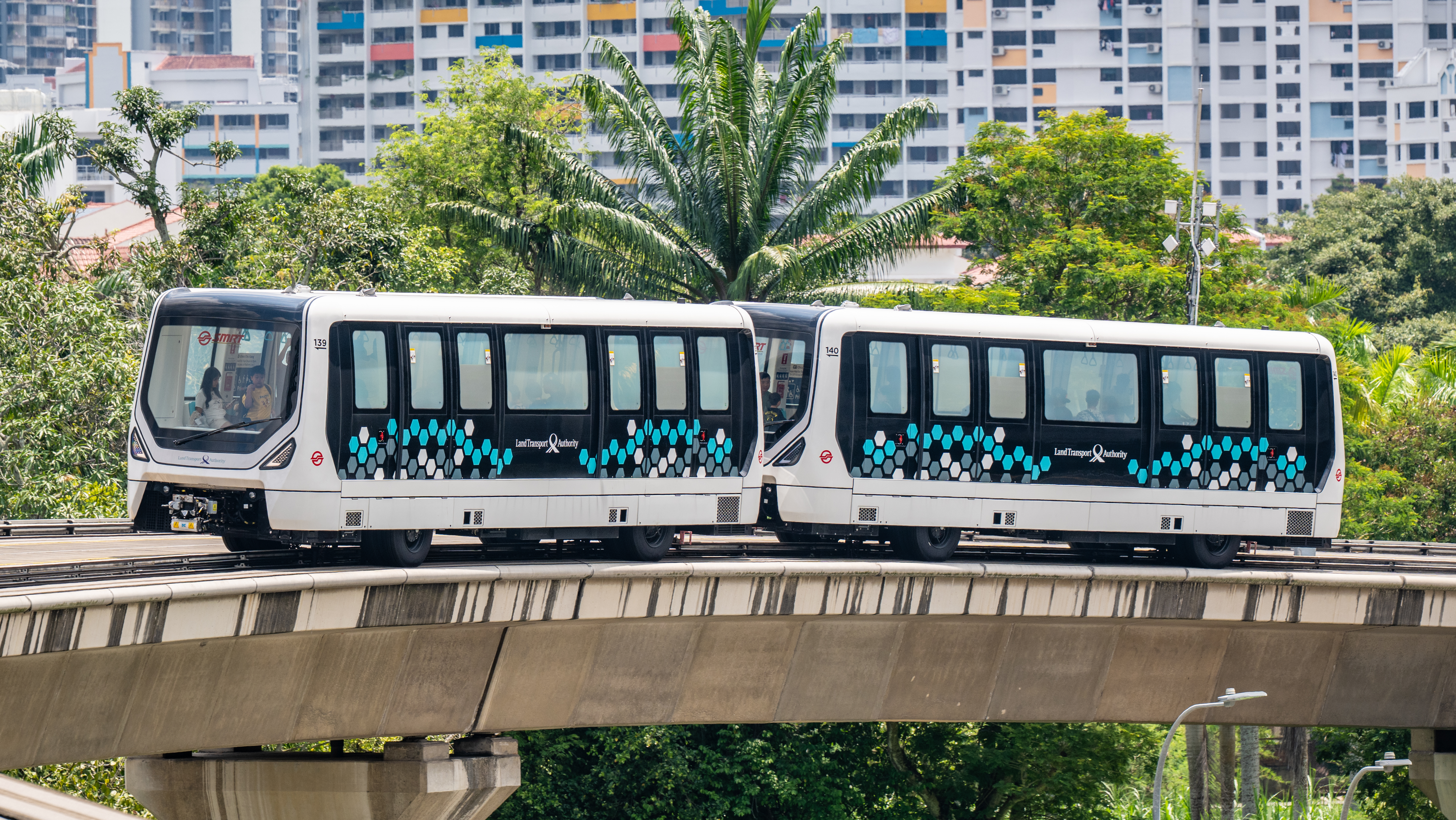
Light Rail Transit

In several new towns, automated rubber-tyred light rail transit systems function as feeders to the main MRT network in lieu of feeder buses. The total length of Singapore's LRT systems is 28.8 km (17.90 mi). The first LRT line, which is operated by SMRT Light Rail, opened in Bukit Panjang in 1999 to provide a connection to Choa Chu Kang in neighbouring Choa Chu Kang New Town. Although subsequently hit by over 50 incidents, some of which resulted in several days of system suspension, similar systems albeit from a different company were introduced in Sengkang and Punggol in 2003 and 2005 respectively, both operated by SBS Transit.

=== International rail links ===
The international railway line to Malaysia is an extension of the Malaysian rail network operated by Keretapi Tanah Melayu (Malayan Railways). Since 1 July 2011, Woodlands Train Checkpoint serves as the southern terminus of the KTM rail network. Previously, KTM trains terminated at Tanjong Pagar railway station in central Singapore. A new rail link, the Johor Bahru–Singapore Rapid Transit System Link between Woodlands North and Bukit Chagar, Johor Bahru, is being constructed and is targeted for completion by 2027.

== Air transport ==
=== Airlines ===
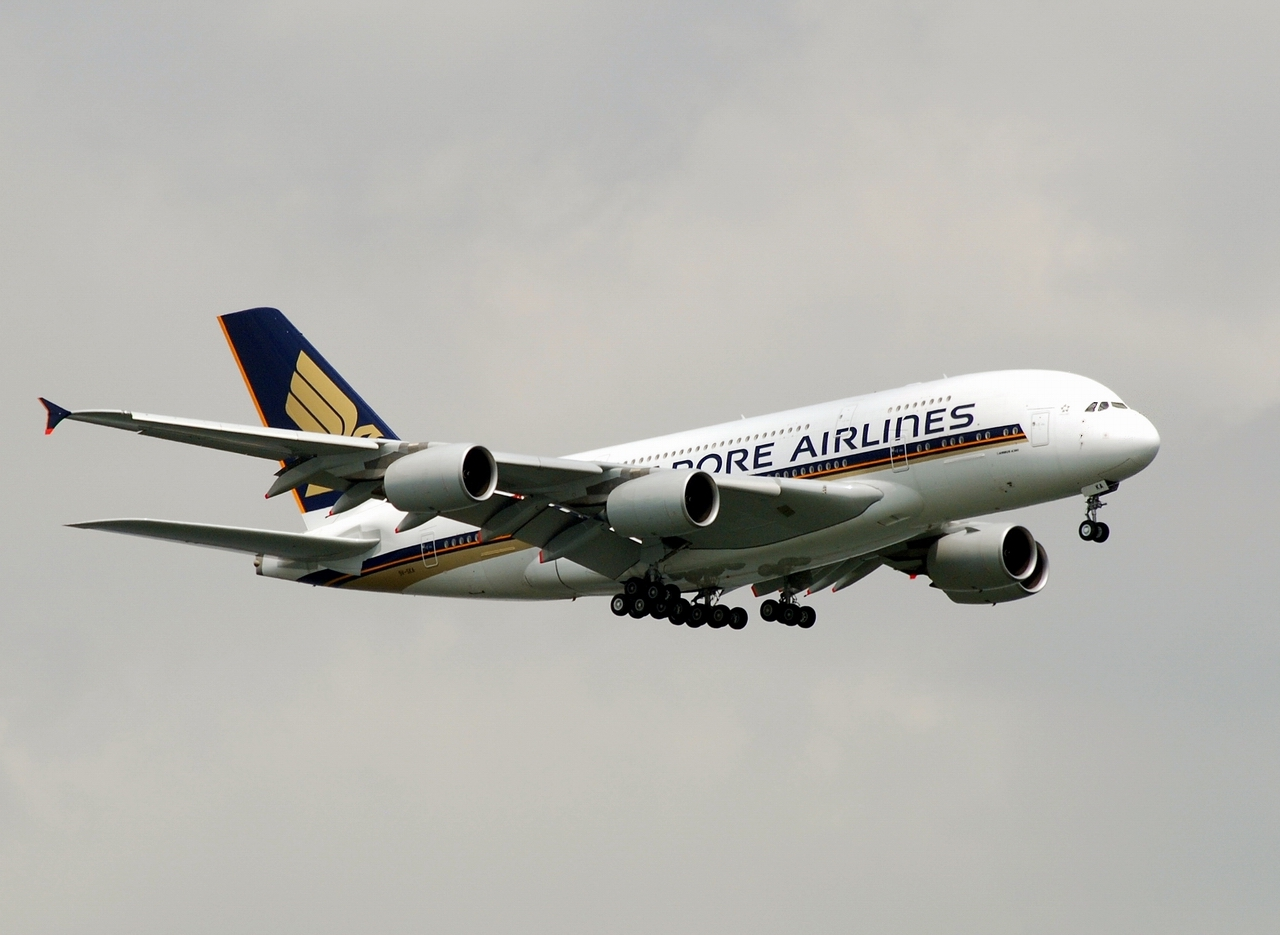
Singapore Airlines is the flag carrier of Singapore

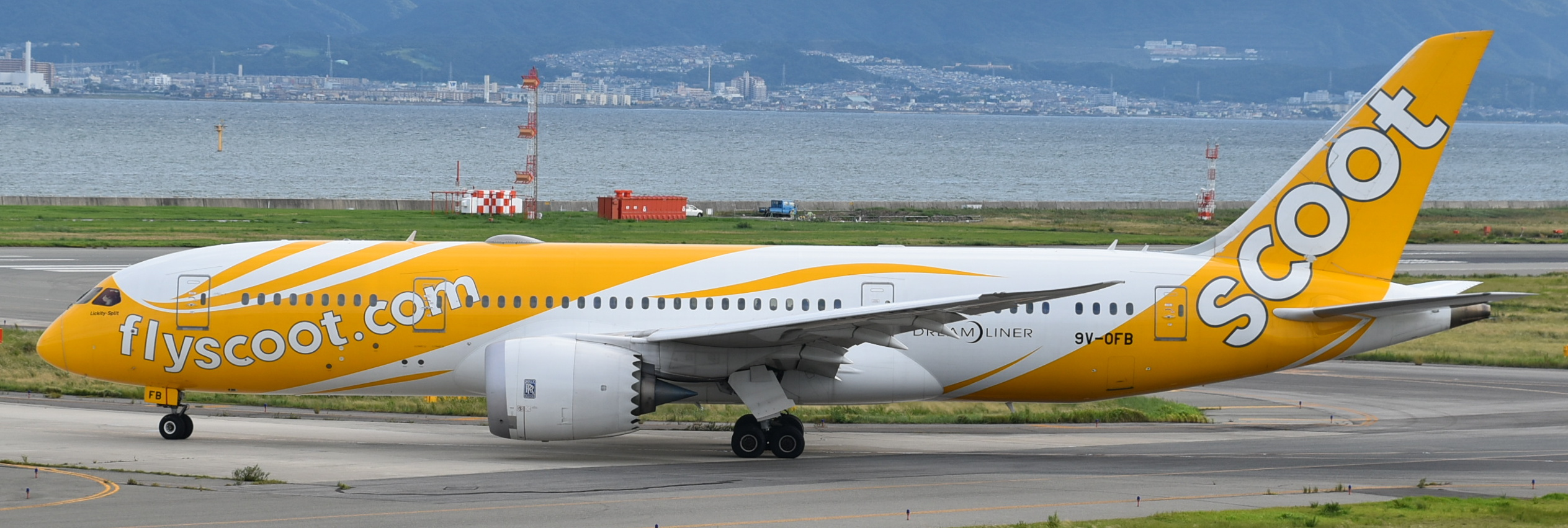
Scoot is the low-cost arm of Singapore Airlines

The national flag carrier is Singapore Airlines. The other Singaporean based airline is Scoot.

Malaysia's Firefly is the sole operator with scheduled services out of Seletar Airport.

=== Airports ===
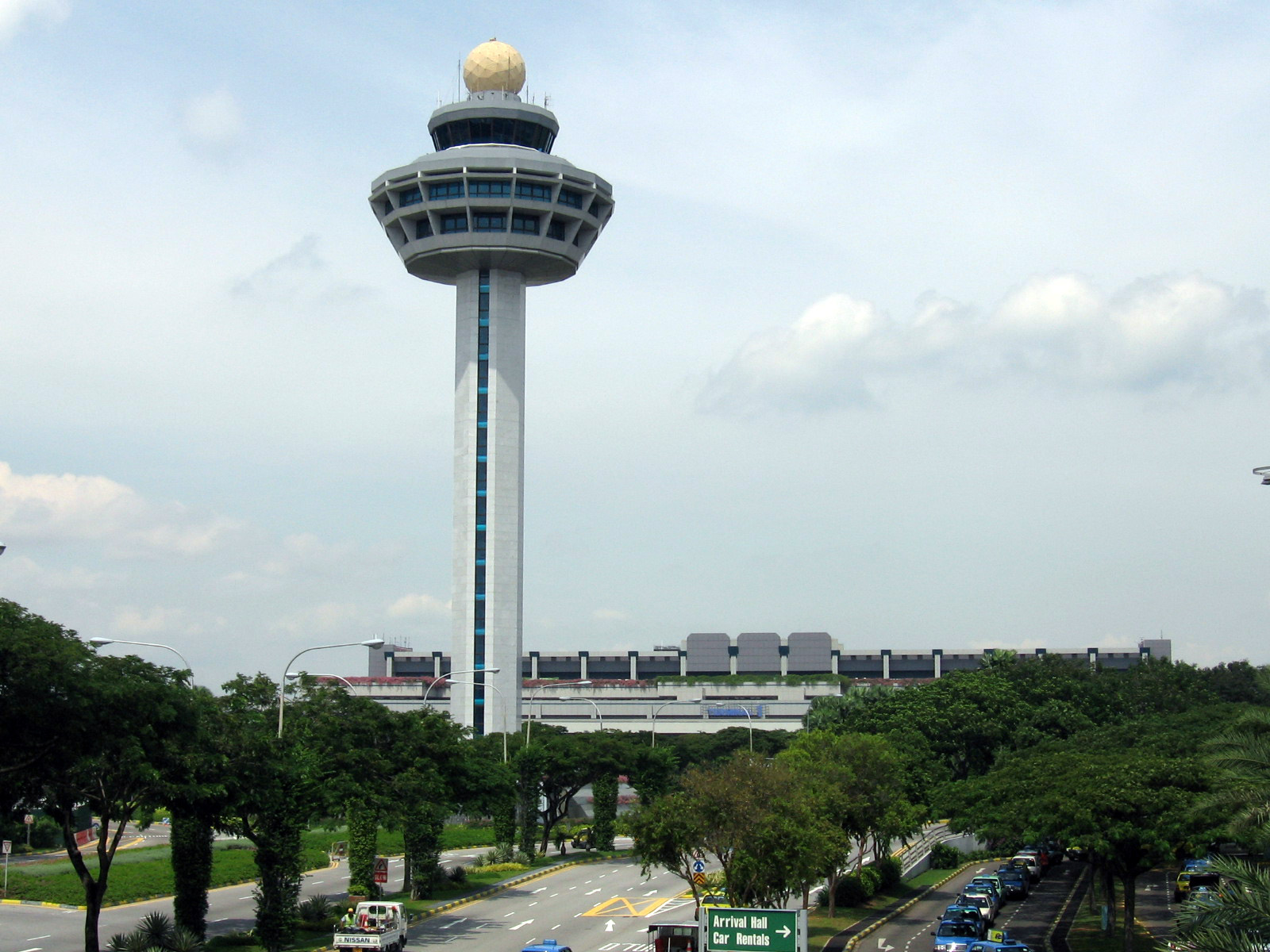
Control tower of Singapore Changi Airport

The aviation industry is regulated by the Civil Aviation Authority of Singapore, a statutory board of the Singapore government under the Ministry of Transport.

An open skies agreement was concluded with the United Kingdom in October 2007 permitting unrestricted services from Singapore by UK carriers. Singapore carriers were allowed to operate domestic UK services as well as services beyond London Heathrow to a number of destinations, including the United States along with Canada.

Singapore Changi Airport, with its four terminals, is one of the most important air hubs in the region. The international airport is situated at the easternmost tip of the main island, and serves 185 cities in 58 countries. With the recent opening of the fourth terminal, Changi is now capable of handling more than 70 million passengers every year. Singapore Changi Airport is also named World's Best Airport in 2023 by Skytrax, its 12th selection in the past few decades.

Seletar Airport is Singapore's first civil aviation airport and is primarily used for private aviation. Smaller turbo props also serve Seletar Airport.

Airport and airbase technical data
Airport	ICAO	IATA	Usage	Runway	Length (ft)	Length (m)	Remarks
Paya Lebar Air Base	WSAP	QPG	Military	Paved	12400	3800	Former civilian
Seletar Airport	WSSL	XSP	Civilian/military	Paved	6023	1836	Mainly non-scheduled flights
Sembawang Air Base	WSAG		Military	Paved	3000	914
Singapore Changi Airport	WSSS	SIN	Civilian	Paved	13200	4000
Tengah Air Base	WSAT	TGA	Military	Paved	8900	2713

== Aerial lift transport ==
=== Cable car ===
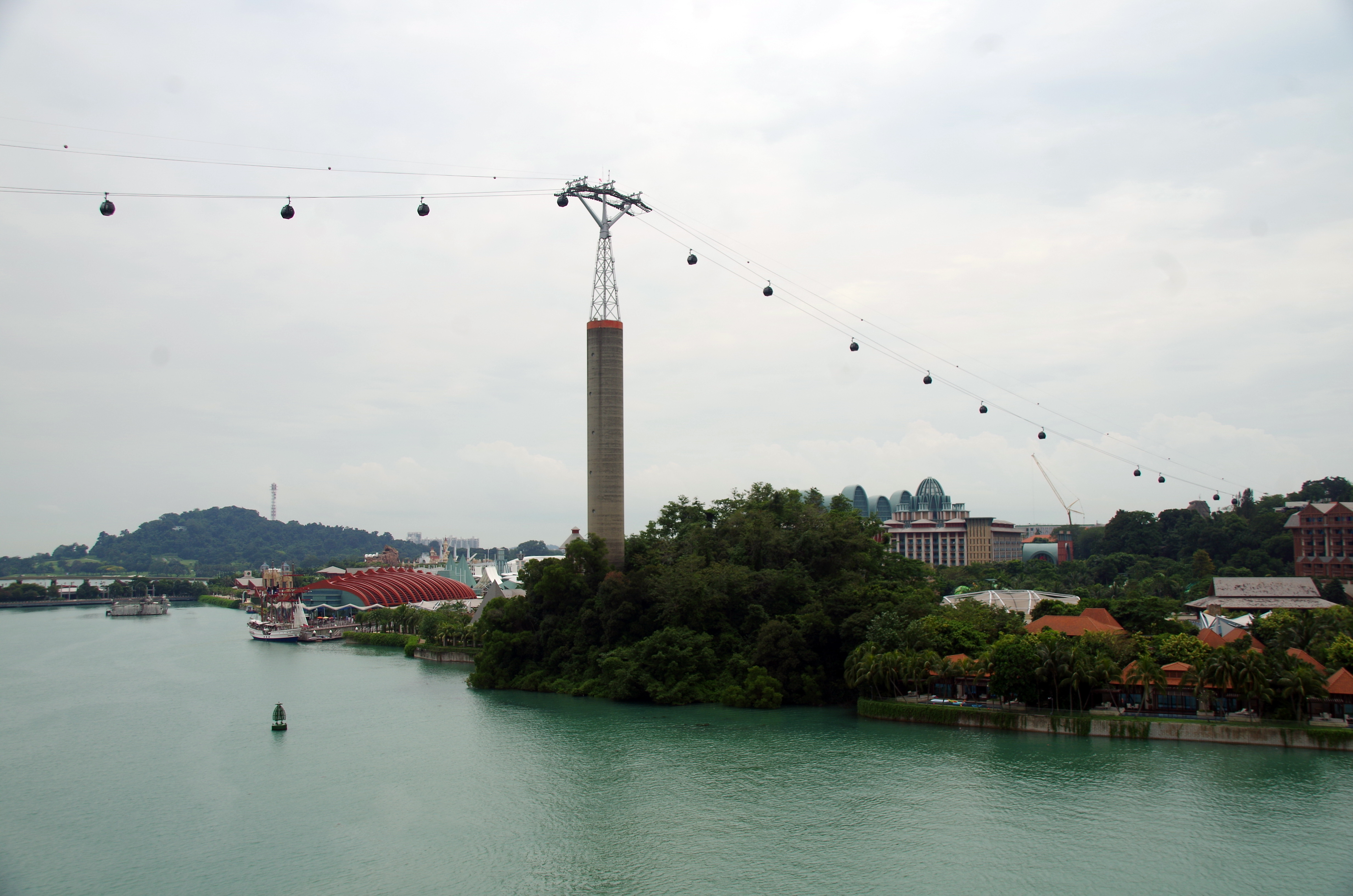
The Singapore Cable Car spans across the Keppel Harbour between Singapore and Sentosa.

The Singapore Cable Car is a three-station gondola lift system that plies between Mount Faber on the main island of Singapore and the resort island of Sentosa via HarbourFront. Opened in 1974, it was the first aerial ropeway system in the world to span a harbour. The cable car system underwent a revamp that was completed in August 2010.

In addition, a similar gondola lift system also operates within Sentosa. Opening in 2015, this line provides a connection between Siloso Point and Imbiah.

== Maritime transport ==
=== Ports and harbours ===
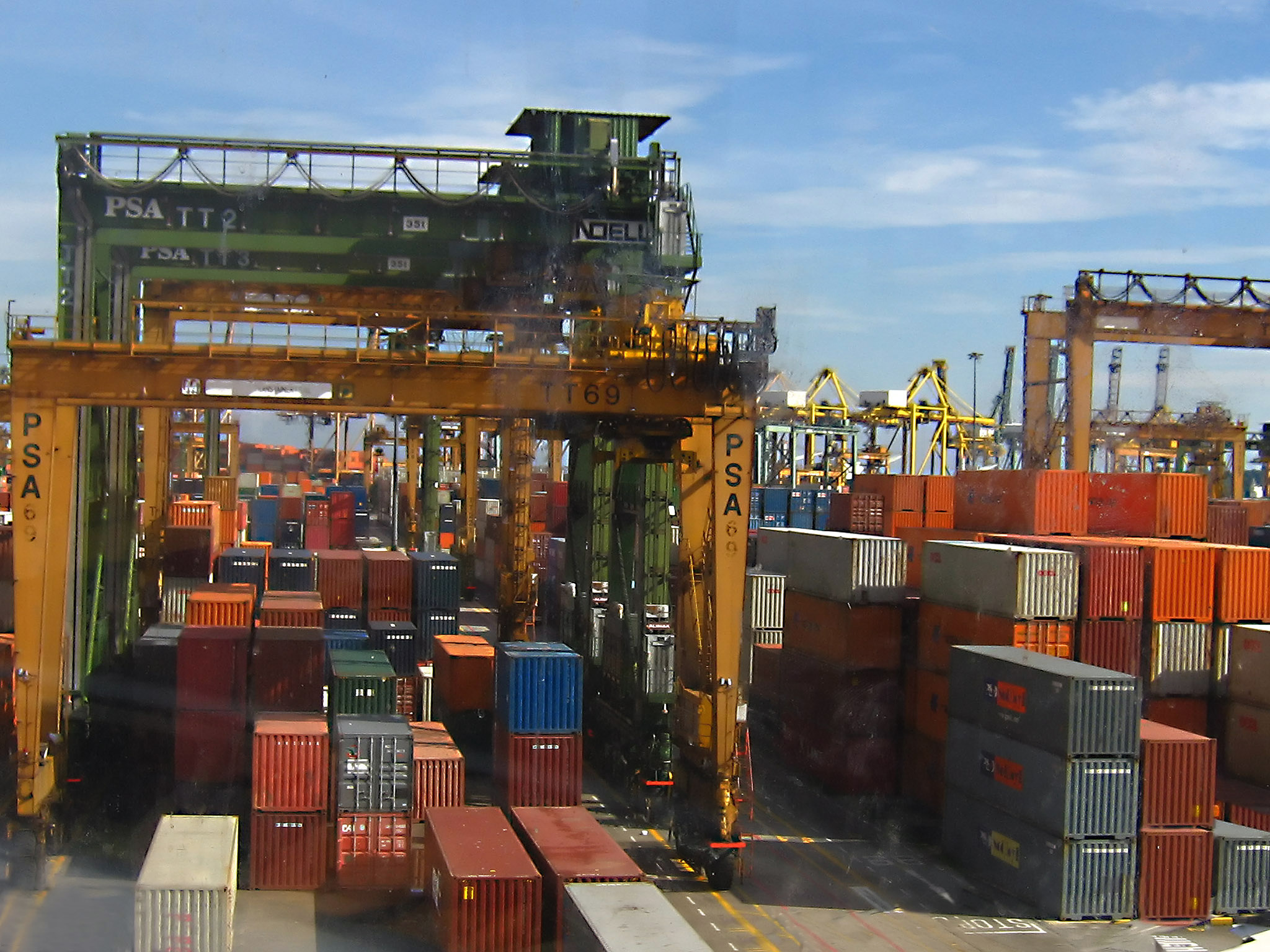
Keppel Container Terminal in Singapore

The Port of Singapore, run by the port operators PSA International (formerly the Port of Singapore Authority) and Jurong Port, is the world's busiest in terms of shipping tonnage handled. 1.04 billion gross tons were handled in 2004, crossing the one billion mark for the first time in Singapore's maritime history. Singapore also emerged as the top port in terms of cargo tonnage handled with 393 million tonnes of cargo in the same year, beating the Port of Rotterdam for the first time in the process. In 2019, it handled a total of 626 million tonnes of cargo.

In 2018, Singapore was ranked second globally in terms of containerised traffic, with 36.6 million Twenty-Foot Equivalent Units (TEUs) handled, and is also the world's busiest hub for transshipment traffic. Additionally, Singapore is the world's largest bunkering hub, with 49.8 million tonnes sold in 2018.

In 2007, the Port of Singapore was ranked the world's busiest port, surpassing Hong Kong and Shanghai. The Port of Singapore is also ranked the Best Seaport in Asia.

Ports and harbours data
Port	Operator	Type	Berths	Quay length (m)	Quay cranes	Area (m^{2})	Capacity (kTEUs)
Asia Automobile (Singapore) (AATS)	K Line/Nippon Yusen/PSA International	Car	2
Brani (BT)	PSA International	Container	8	2,325	26	790,000
Cosco-PSA (CPT)	Cosco/PSA International	Container	5	720		228,000	5,000
Jurong	JTC	Multi-purpose	23	4,486		1,200,028
Keppel (KT)	PSA International	Container	14	3,164	27	1,025,000
Magenta Singapore (MST)	ONE/PSA International	Container	4				4,000
MSC-PSA Asia (MPAT)	MSC/PSA International		7				14
Pasir Panjang Automobile (PPT)	PSA International	Ro-ro	3	1,010		250,000
Pasir Panjang (PPT 1)	PSA International	Container	6	2,145	19	850,000
Pasir Panjang (PPT 2)	PSA International	Container	9	2,972	36	1,390,000
Pasir Panjang (PPT 3)	PSA International	Container	8	2,655	31	940,000
Pasir Panjang (PPT 4)	PSA International	Container	3	1,264	13	700,000
Pasir Panjang (PPT 5)	PSA International	Container	6	2,160	24	830,000
Pasir Panjang (PPT 6)	PSA International	Container	6	2,251	24	800,000
PIL-PSA Singapore (PPST)	PIL/PSA International	Container	3
Sembawang Wharves	PSA International	General	4	660		280,000
Tanjong Pagar (TPT)	PSA International	Container	7	2,097	0	795,000

=== Passenger transport ===
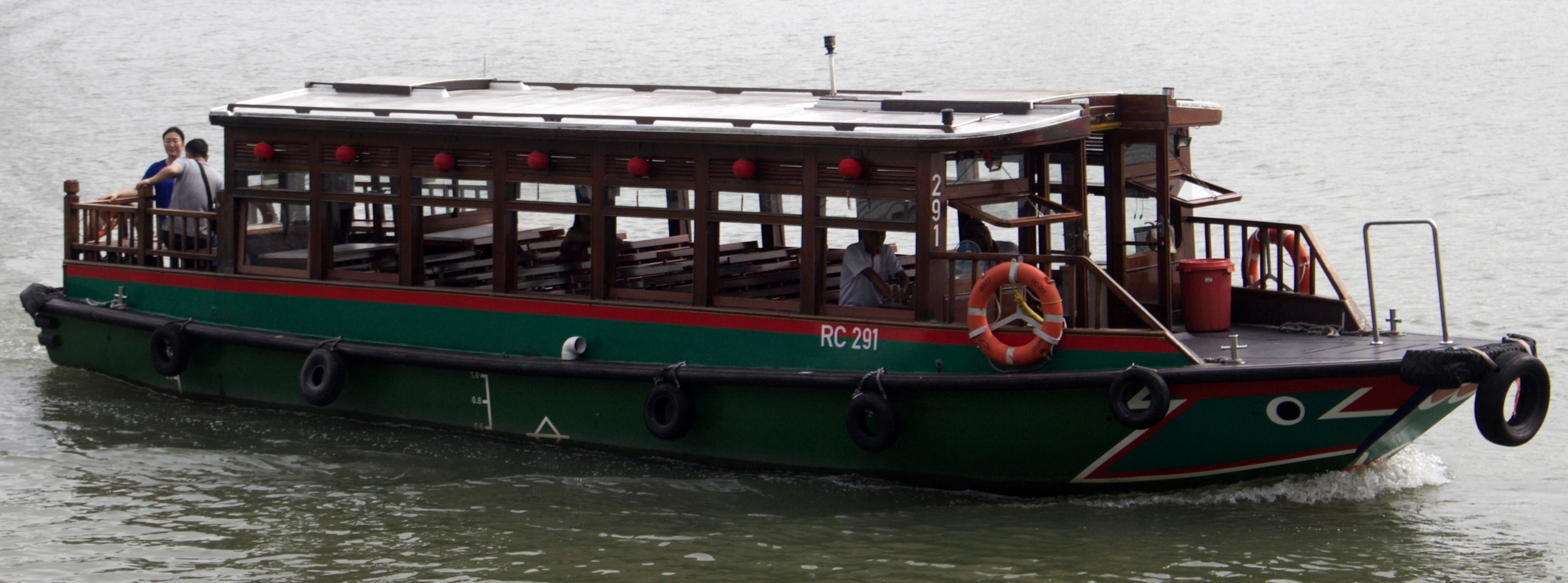
Bumboat on the Singapore River

Water transport within the main island is limited to the River Taxi along the Singapore River. The service was introduced in January 2013, with low ridership. There are also daily scheduled ferry services from the Marina South Pier to the Southern Islands such as Kusu Island, Lazarus Island & Saint John's Island and Sisters' Islands. Changi Point Ferry Terminal in the east offers daily ferry services to Pulau Ubin and some destinations in Johor, Malaysia.

Singapore Cruise Centre (SCC) runs Tanah Merah and HarbourFront Ferry Terminals which are connected by ferry services to Indonesian Riau Islands of Batam, Bintan and Karimun.

In addition to the ferry terminals, the Singapore Cruise Centre (SCC) also operates a cruise terminal which is handled by the International Passenger Terminal (IPT), and has two berths of 310 metres and 270 metres with a height limit of 52 metres. It has a draft of 12 metres. It underwent an upgrade in 2005 to improve its passenger handling facilities. An additional cruise terminal, the Marina Bay Cruise Centre Singapore, began construction in 2009 and was completed in 2012 in order to accommodate bigger cruise ships that are not able to dock at the Singapore Cruise Centre.

== See also ==
- Plug-in electric vehicles in Singapore
