= Simon Henry =

Simon Peter Henry (born July 1961) was the chief financial officer of Royal Dutch Shell. He succeeded Peter Voser in that role who was promoted to chief executive officer of Shell on 1 July 2009. Henry retired in March 2017; his successor was Jessica Uhl.
