= Peter Voser =

Swiss businessman

Dato Seri Laila Jasa Peter Voser DSLJ
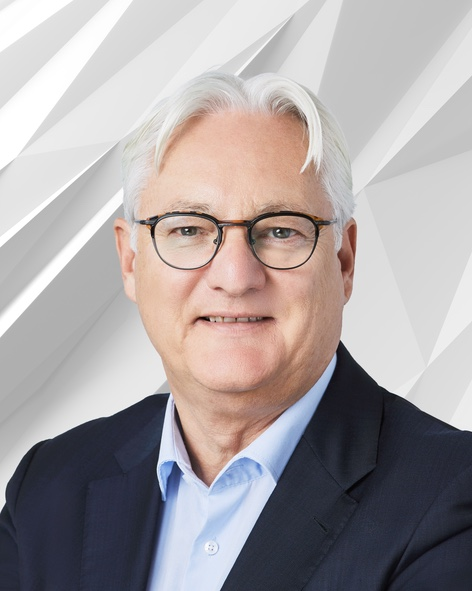
- Peter Voser in 2009
- Born: Peter Robert Voser; 29 August 1958 (age 68); Baden, Switzerland
- Education: Zurich University of Applied Sciences
- Occupation: Businessman
- Years active: 1982–present
- Title: Chairman of ABB
- Board member of: IBM Corporation / Temasek Holdings / PSA International
- Spouse: Daniela Voser
- Children: 3

Peter Robert Voser (born 29 August 1958) is a Swiss businessman who is the chairman of the Swedish-Swiss company ABB. He was the CEO of the Dutch-British corporation Royal Dutch Shell from July 2009 to December 2013. He was interim CEO of ABB from April 2019 to February 2020. He started his career at Royal Dutch Shell in 1982, working in a number of finance and business roles in different countries. From 2002 to 2005 he was chief financial officer for ABB and Royal Dutch Shell. In 2004, he was appointed Royal Dutch Shell's chief financial officer (CFO) and then CEO in July 2009.

== Early life ==
Voser was born in Baden, Switzerland in 1958. From 1979 to 1982 he studied for a Business Administration degree from Zurich University of Applied Sciences, Switzerland.

== Career ==
In 1982, at age 24, Voser joined Shell and held a variety of finance and business roles in Switzerland, the UK, Argentina and Chile, as well as chief financial officer of Oil Products.

From 2002 to 2004, Voser was CFO and an executive committee member of the Asea Brown Boveri (ABB) Group of Companies. Voser is active in a number of international and bilateral organisations, including the European Round Table of Industrialists and The Business Council.

In 2010, he became a director of Catalyst, a non-profit organisation working to build inclusive environments and expand opportunities for women at work.

Voser was CFO of Shell until mid-2009, when he became the company's CEO and was succeeded as CFO by Simon Henry. On 2 May 2013, it was announced that Voser would retire from Shell in the first half of 2014. On 17 April 2019, Voser was named interim Chief Executive Officer of ABB. and also Board Director in IBM since 2015.

== Other activities ==
=== Government agencies ===
- Economic Development Board (EDB) Singapore, Member of the International Advisory Council

=== Corporate boards ===
- Temasek Holdings, Singapore Member of the Board of Directors (since 2015)
- PSA International, Singapore, Chairman (since 2019)
- ABB, Sweden, Chairman of the Board of Directors (since 2015)
- IBM, USA, Member of the Board of Directors (since 2014)

== Recognition ==
On 15 July 2011, His Majesty the Sultan of Brunei awarded Voser the Order of Paduka Seri Laila Jasa in recognition of his services to Brunei. In April 2022 Peter Voser was conferred the Honorary Citizen Award by the Singapore Government.

- Order of Paduka Seri Laila Jasa Second Class (DSLJ) – Dato Seri Laila Jasa (15 July 2011)

== Controversy ==
Royal Dutch Shell paid former chief executive Peter Voser £22m in his last years 2012–2013 through share awards and other performance-related bonuses while the company failed to perform well. Voser was responsible for the controversial projects of the US oil shale lands, the Niger Delta and the Arctic oil exploration.

== Personal life ==
Voser is married to Daniela and has three children. Since September 2013 he has been serving in the position of the chairman of the St. Gallen Foundation for International Studies, replacing Josef Ackermann.

Business positions
Preceded by Jeroen van der Veer	Chief Executive Officer of Royal Dutch Shell; 2009–2013	Succeeded by Ben van Beurden
