= Ben van Beurden =

Dutch businessman

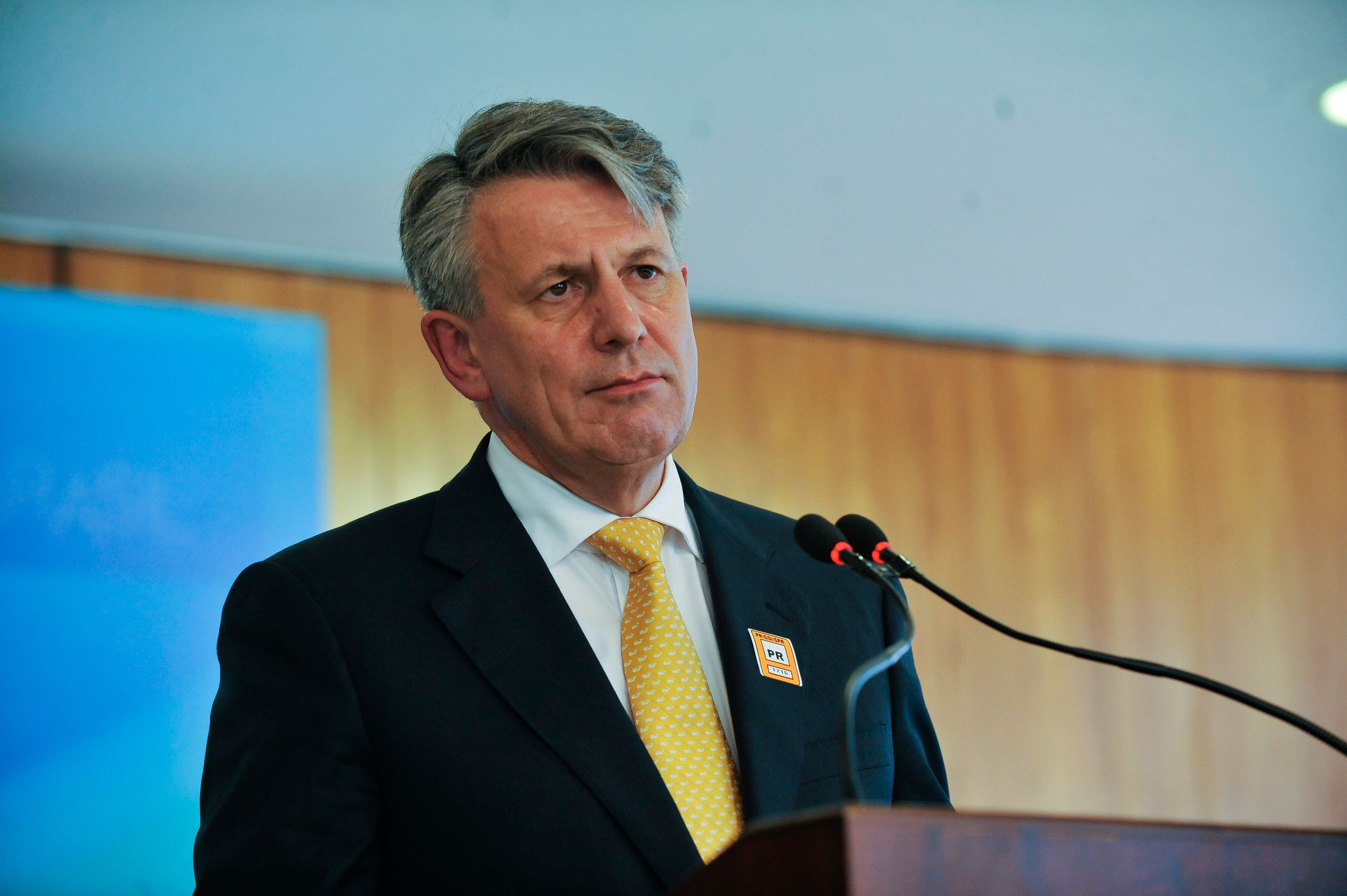
- Van Beurden in 2015
- Born: Bernardus Cornelis Adriana Margriet van Beurden; 23 April 1958 (age 67); Roosendaal, Netherlands
- Education: Delft University of Technology
- Years active: 1983–present
- Title: Former CEO, Royal Dutch Shell
- Term: 2014–2022
- Predecessor: Peter Voser
- Successor: Wael Sawan
- Spouse: Stacey van Beurden
- Children: 4

Bernardus Cornelis Adriana Margriet "Ben" van Beurden (born 23 April 1958) is a Dutch businessman who was the CEO of Shell plc from 2014 to 2022. He joined Shell in 1983, after earning a master's degree in chemical engineering from Delft University of Technology, Netherlands.

During his tenure as head of Shell, the company was ordered by a Netherlands court to reduce its carbon emissions by 45% by 2030. Despite the scientific consensus on climate change, Van Beurden described the ruling as "unreasonable" and said the company had no intentions to meet the court-ordered climate targets.

In early‑2022, ClientEarth began civil proceedings against van Beurden and 12 other directors of UK‑based Shell plc in an attempt to hold these individuals personally responsible for failing to adequately prepare the company for a transition to carbon neutrality. More specifically ClientEarth asserts that these individuals have a fiduciary duty under the UK Companies Act to operate in accordance with the 2015 Paris Agreement.

Since January 2024, van Beurden has been a senior adviser at KKR, a US investment firm.

== Career ==
Van Beurden's career at Shell spanned both upstream and downstream businesses. He held a number of operational and commercial roles including those in Chemicals and LNG. Van Beurden worked for Shell in a number of countries, including his native Netherlands, Turkey, Malaysia, United Kingdom and the United States.

Van Beurden was an assistant to Shell chairman Phil Watts from 2002 to 2004, during which time Shell was embroiled in an accounting scandal where it had overstated its oil reserves.

He held the post of Vice President for Manufacturing Excellence from January 2005 to December 2006. Van Beurden was the Executive Vice President Chemicals from December 2006 based out of London, during which time he was on the boards of a number of industry associations, including the International Council of Chemical Associations and the European Chemical Industry Council. He was the Director of Shell's Downstream business from January to September 2013.

Lauded for his "deep knowledge of the industry and proven executive experience across a range of Shell businesses", Van Beurden is credited with turning around Shell's struggling chemicals division. From a loss-making enterprise in 2008, the Chemicals business now contributes 5 percent of net earnings. He also worked for a third of his 30-year Shell career in its liquefied natural gas business, which has become a crucial driver of the group's growth. Van Beurden repeatedly called to environmental issues for governments and corporations to tackle global energy consumption beyond supply chains.

In 2014 Van Beurden became the chief executive officer of Shell. In 2014, he was paid €24.2 million. In 2018, Van Beurden's compensation was approximately £17.2 million.

Van Beurden was scheduled to retire from Shell at the end of 2022. In January 2023, Wael Sawan succeeded him as CEO.

During his tenure as head of Shell, the company was ordered by a Netherlands court to reduce its carbon emissions by 45% by 2030. Van Beurden described the ruling as "unreasonable" and said the company had no intentions to meet the court-ordered climate targets. At the same time, Shell's profits were rising sharply, the company raised its dividend by almost 40%, and kickstarted share buybacks worth $2 billion.

He is a member of the European Round Table of Industrialists (ERT), and a board member of International Council of Chemicals Associations and the European Chemical Industry Council.

In November 2022, President of Kazakhstan Kassym-Jomart Tokayev awarded van Beurden the Order of Dostyk II degree for his contribution to the oil and gas industry.

van Beurden joined Kohlberg Kravis Roberts (KKR) in January 2024 as a senior adviser. He is advising on the firm's global climate strategy in its infrastructure investment unit on a part-time basis.

== Personal life ==
With his wife Stacey, he has three daughters and a son.

Business positions
Preceded by Peter Voser	Chief Executive Officer of Royal Dutch Shell; 2014–2022	Succeeded by Wael Sawan
