= Wael Sawan =

Lebanese-Canadian business executive

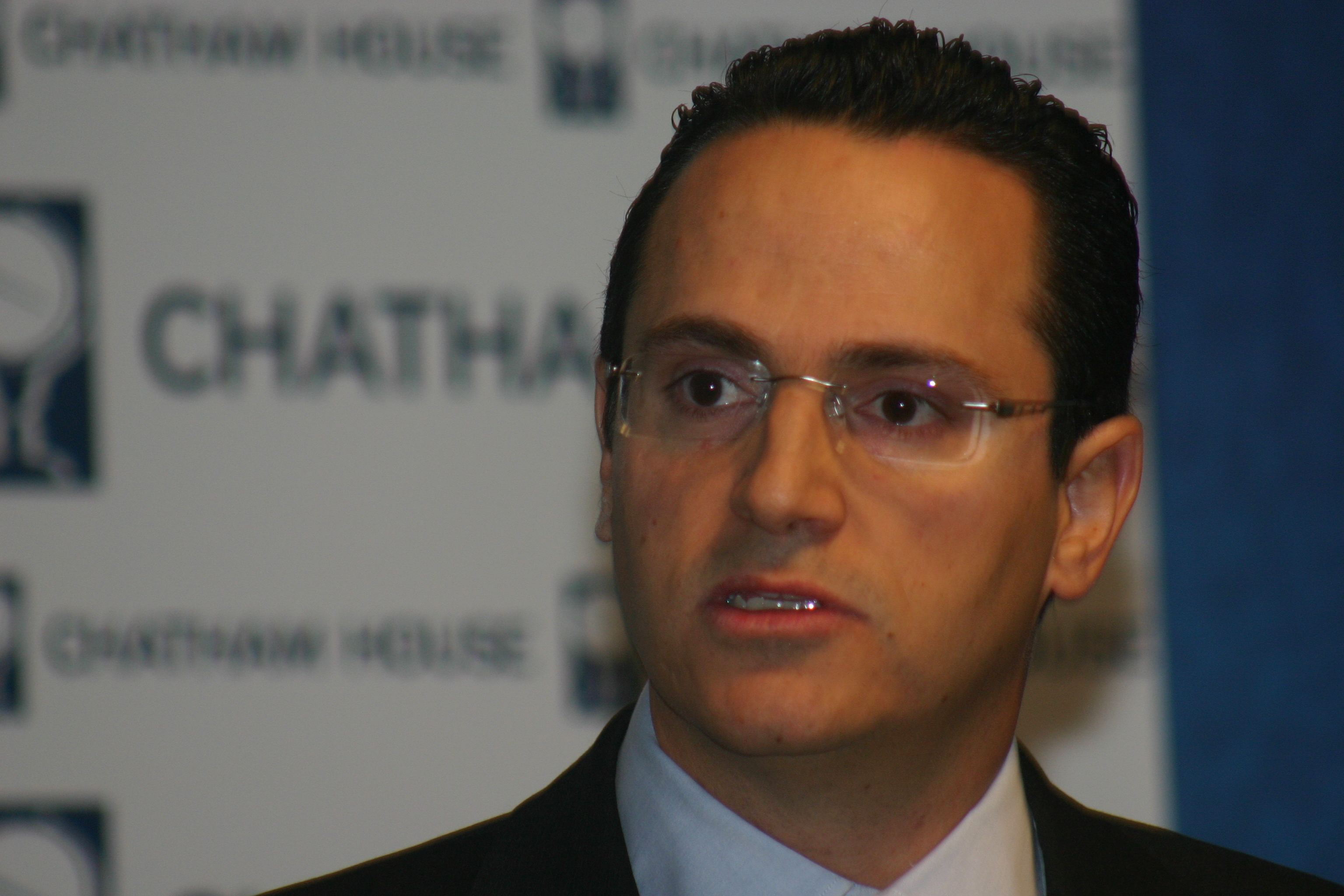
- Sawan in 2010
- Born: 1974 (age 51–52); Beirut, Lebanon
- Education: McGill University (MEng); Harvard University (MBA)
- Title: CEO, Shell plc
- Term: January 2023-
- Predecessor: Ben van Beurden
- Spouse: Nicole Sawan
- Children: 3 sons

Wael Sawan (Arabic: وائل صوان; born 1974) is a Lebanese-Canadian business executive, and the CEO of Shell plc since January 2023.

== Early life and education ==
Sawan was born in Beirut in 1974. He grew up in Dubai, and earned a master's degree in chemical engineering from McGill University in Canada. He took a career break and earned an MBA from Harvard Business School.

He has dual Lebanese and Canadian nationality.

== Career ==
Sawan joined Shell in 1997 as an engineer with Petroleum Development Oman. He later served as Managing Director and Chairman of Qatar Shell, where he oversaw Shell's business in Qatar, including its liquefied natural gas (LNG) and Pearl Gas-to-Liquids (GTL) operations. He rose to become head of Shell's integrated gas and renewables division, and succeeded Ben van Beurden as CEO on 1 January 2023. In the summer of 2023 he announced that Shell will be dropping plans to cut oil production each year for the rest of the decade.

Sawan received a pay packet of £7.9 million ($10.1 million) for 2023, having become chief executive at the start of 2023 on an annual salary of £1.4 million (not including other compensation). In 2025, Sawan's total compensation from Shell was £13.8 million, an increase of 60% from the £8.6 million he received in 2024.

Under Sawan, Shell has focused on share buybacks with a mission of narrowing the gap with US-domiciled energy majors. Shell is currently spending $3.5 billion a quarter on buybacks. Buybacks have run at $3 billion or more for 14 quarters in a row.

On 3 August 2026, Sawan announced a retreat from renewables for Shell and the sale of onshore renewable energy operations to TotalEnergies.

== Personal life ==
Sawan is married to Nicole, and they have three sons.

Business positions
Preceded by Ben van Beurden	Chief Executive Officer of Royal Dutch Shell; 2023–present	Succeeded by not applicable
