= PSA International =

Port operator

PSA International Pte. Ltd.
- Type: Private
- Industry: Port Operator, Logistics
- Founded: April 1, 1964; 62 years ago (as Port of Singapore Authority); October 1, 1997; 28 years ago (as PSA Corporation Ltd), December 2003; 22 years ago (as PSA International Pte. Ltd.)
- Headquarters: 1 Harbour Drive, PSA Horizons, Singapore 117352
- Key people: Peter Voser (group chairman); Ong Kim Pong (group CEO)
- Services: Port services, logistics services, marine services, digital services
- Revenue: S$8.264 billion (2025)
- Parent: Temasek Holdings
- Website: globalpsa.com

PSA International Pte. Ltd., formerly the Port of Singapore Authority, is a global port operator and supply chain company. One of the largest port operators in the world, PSA's portfolio includes an integrated network of deepsea, rail, and inland terminals spanning 45 countries. Headquartered in Singapore, the operator encompasses supply chain solutions, marine, and digital businesses, and handled over 105 million TEUs of containers in 2025.

== History ==
Under the 1912 Straits Settlements Port Ordinance, the Singapore Harbour Board was formed on 1 July 1913. On 1 April 1964, the Port of Singapore Authority came into being under the 1963 Port of Singapore Authority Ordinance to replace the Singapore Harbour Board and several organisations that have been operating in the port.

In the 1970s, PSA started building a container port in Singapore, and in 1972, handled their first container ship. A decade later, they reached the milestone of one-million-TEU of number of containers processed. They later reached the 5 million TEU mark by 1990, making Singapore the world's largest container port at the time. The company became a global operator after it first started its global expansion in 1996 through port interests in Dalian, China.

A parliamentary bill was passed on 25 August 1997, to turn the Port of Singapore Authority, a state organisation into an independent commercial company. PSA Corporation Limited was thus corporatised on 1 October 1997. The company kept the initials "PSA" as its brand name but it is no longer an acronym. The regulatory functions of the former authority were transferred to Singapore's new maritime regulator, the Maritime and Port Authority of Singapore (MPA).

In order to focus on its core port business, PSA Corporation set up The HarbourFront Limited (present day Mapletree) on 7 December 2000, to spearhead development of its properties.

Following a restructuring exercise in December 2003, PSA International Pte Ltd. became the holding company for the PSA Group of companies.

In March 2022, it was announced by PSA International and Halifax Port Authority that PSA has acquired the Fairview Cove Container Terminal (Ceres Halifax Inc.) from Nippon Yusen Kabushiki Kaisha.

=== Port assets ===
PSA International Port terminals
City	Country	Port (Terminal)	Ownership
Antwerp	Belgium	Port of Antwerp (Europa Terminal)	100%
Antwerp	Belgium	Port of Antwerp (Noordzee Terminal)	100%
Antwerp	Belgium	Port of Antwerp (MSC PSA European Terminal)	Joint venture between TiL and PSA
Bangkok	Thailand	Bangkok Port (Thai Connectivity Terminal)	
Buenaventura	Colombia	Port of Buenaventura (SPIA Terminal)	
Buenos Aires	Argentina	Port of Buenos Aires (Exolgan Container Terminal)	
Busan	South Korea	Port of Busan (Pusan Newport International Terminal)	
Busan	South Korea	Port of Busan (HMM PSA New-Port Terminal)	
Chennai	India	Chennai Port (Chennai International Terminals)	
Dalian	China	Port of Dalian (Dalian Container Terminal)	
Damman	Saudi Arabia	King Abdul Aziz Port (King Abdulaziz Port Dammam)	
Eddystone	United States	PSA Penn Terminals	
Fuzhou	China	Port of Fuzhou (Fuzhou Container Terminals)	
Gdańsk	Poland	Port of Gdańsk (Baltic Hub Container Terminal)	
Genoa	Italy	Port of Genoa (PSA Genova Pra Terminal)	
Genoa	Italy	Port of Genoa (Southern European Container Hub)	
Guangzhou	China	Port of Guangzhou (Guangzhou Container Terminal)	
Halifax	Canada	Port of Halifax (PSA Halifax Atlantic Hub)	51% PSA, 49% TIL
Halifax	Canada	Port of Halifax (PSA Halifax Fairview Cove)	51% PSA, 49% TIL
Incheon	South Korea	Incheon Port (Incheon Container Terminal)	
Jakarta	Indonesia	Port of Tanjung Priok (New Priok Container Terminal One)	
Kitakyushu	Japan	Port of Kitakyushu (Hibiki Container Terminal)	
Laem Chabang	Thailand	Port of Laem Chabang (Eastern Sea Laem Chabang Terminal)	
Lianyungang	China	Port of Lianyungang (LYD-PSA Container Terminal)	
Mersin	Turkey	Port of Mersin (Mersin International Port)	
Mumbai	India	Mumbai Port (Bharat Mumbai Container Terminals)	
Panama	Panama	Panama International Terminal	
Qinzhou	China	Port of Beibu Gulf (Beibu Gulf International Container Terminal)	
Sines	Portugal	Port of Sines (Sines Container Terminal)	Joint venture between PSA and TiL
Singapore	Singapore	Port of Singapore (Brani Terminal)	
Singapore	Singapore	Port of Singapore (Keppel Terminal)	
Singapore	Singapore	Port of Singapore (Pasir Panjang Terminals)	
Singapore	Singapore	Port of Singapore (Tuas Port)	
Singapore	Singapore	Port of Singapore (Jurong Island Terminal)	
Singapore	Singapore	Port of Singapore (Cosco-PSA Terminal)	51%
Singapore	Singapore	Port of Singapore (MSC PSA Asia Terminal)	Joint venture between TiL and PSA
Tianjin	China	Port of Tianjin (Tianjin Port Alliance International Container Terminal)	
Tianjin	China	Port of Tianjin (Tianjin Port Pacific International Container Terminal)	
Venice	Italy	Port of Venice (Venice Container Terminal)	
Vũng Tàu	Vietnam	SP-PSA International Port	

== PSA Marine ==
PSA Marine Pte Ltd., a wholly owned subsidiary of PSA International, provides marine services to the maritime and shipping community. They include pilotage and port and terminal towage. PSA Marine owns and operates a fleet of over 80 vessels in Singapore, Malaysia, Hong Kong, mainland China, India, Australia, Panama, Peru and Oman.
