= Plug-in electric vehicles in Singapore =

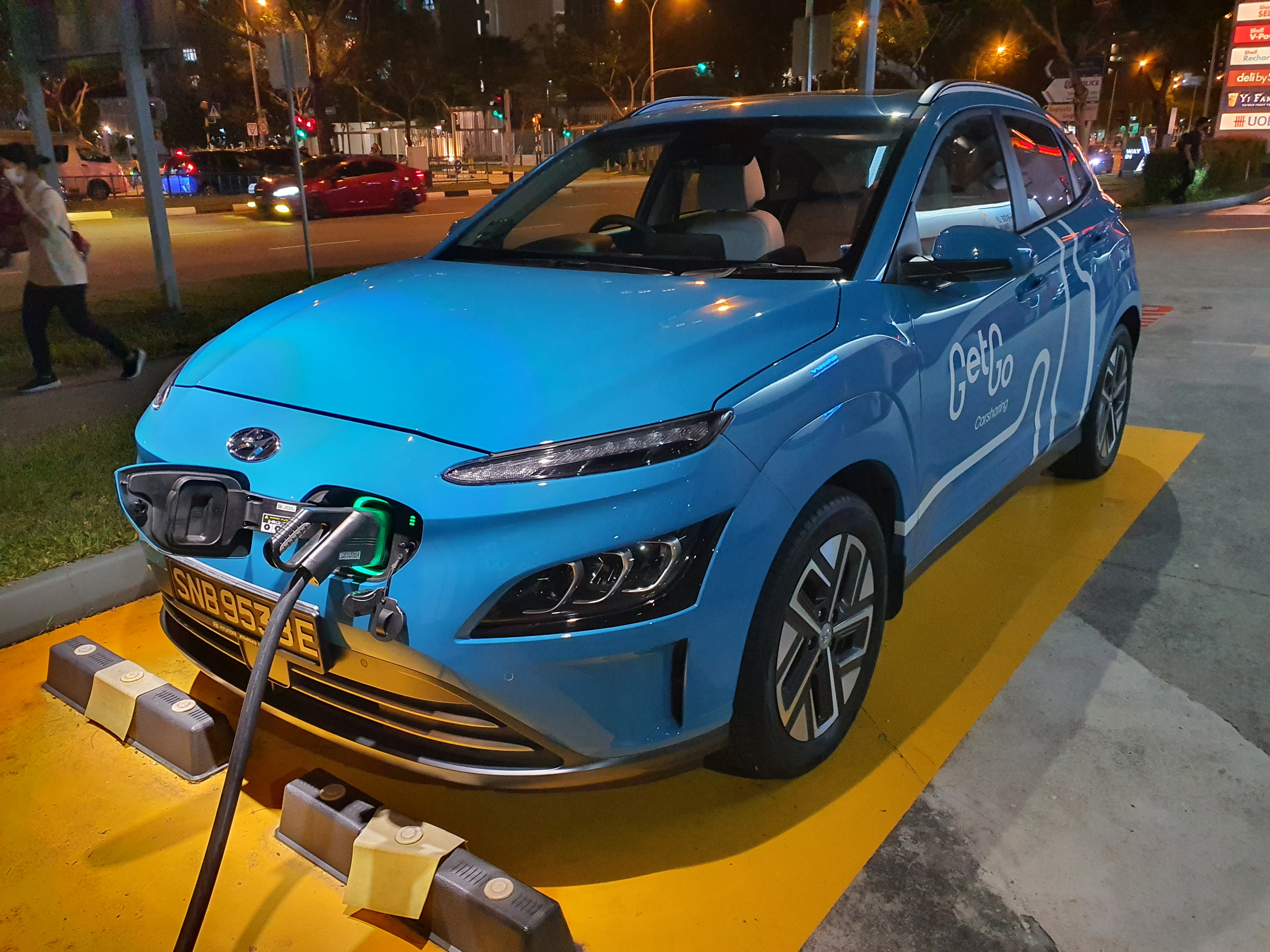
Getgo Carsharing's Hyundai Kona Electric car charging at a Royal Dutch Shell petrol station in Singapore.

The adoption of electric vehicles in Singapore is supported by the Singapore government via the Singapore Green Plan 2030 to have new car models required to run on cleaner energy sources and installation of up to 60,000 electric vehicle charging stations. Financial incentives are given to the public for installation of charging points and purchase of electric cars.

As of November 2025, there were 46,029 electric vehicles registered in Singapore, equivalent to seven percent of all vehicles in the country.

== Charging infrastructure ==
In April 2019, electric car sharing company, BlueSG, released 99 charging points, which is around 13 per cent of BlueSG's network of 755 chargers at 191 stations, across 25 locations for public use. It had also promised to release 20 per cent of its projected of 2,000 chargers by 2020.

In July 2021, there were around 2,000 public charging stations in Singapore, with one-third of the stations in private premises which are mostly in commercial developments like shopping malls. On 28 July, the network of 1,500 BlueSG charging stations was sold to TotalEnergies, which would continue to operate and maintain the charging stations. In September, a tender was awarded to install more than 600 charging points in public carparks. Charge+ and a consortium led by ComfortDelGro won the tender.

In March 2022, during a Committee of Supply debate on the Singapore Green Plan 2030, Transport Minister S Iswaran announced that by 2025, every HDB car parks will have a minimum of three charging points each. Tender to install the charging points is to be launched within the first half of 2022. The tender was awarded to 5 operators, Charge+, ComfortDelGro Engineering, SP Mobility, Shell Eastern Petroleum and Strides Automotive Services, to install and operate at least three charging points in each HDB carpark, making a total of at least 12,000 EV charging points.

In July 2022, the number of charging stations increased to 2,500.

In April 2023, The Straits Times reported that slightly more than 30 EV chargers had been installed in 12 Housing and Development Board (HDB) carparks under the new tender. ChargEco, a joint venture of electricity supplier YTL PowerSeraya and Strides Automotive Services, and Charge+ were the only two out of the five operators who had installed the chargers.

By December 2023, the number of charging stations increased to almost 6,000 charging points.

As of January 2024, more than 2,400 EV chargers had been installed at about 700 HDB residential carpark. In March, EV-electric (EVe), a subsidiary of the Land Transport Authority (LTA) to manage charging points deployment, signed an agreement with Huawei to install Ultra-fast chargers in Singapore.

On 4 August 2025, BlueSG announced its car-sharing service would be paused from 8 August as part of a major relaunch and the introduction of a new service in 2026. TotalEnergies (who owned BlueSG) also applied to LTA to terminate its contract to maintain and operate the charging network it bought from BlueSG which LTA agreed. The termination agreement was signed and effective on 30 September. While all the charging points will be transferred to other operators by 31 December, 63 of them will be taken over by SP Mobility by 28 November.

In January 2026, SP Mobility proposed to take over ChargEco and seek the Competition and Consumer Commission of Singapore's (CCS) determination if the transaction would be anti-competitive. CCS invited public feedback on the proposed takeover on the impact on the users whether would it be anti-competitive. In March, SP Mobility submitted a set of commitments such as not raising prices at HDB carparks in the east region, where ChargEco had installed chargers, beyond the costs before the proposed acquisition, unless there are costs from regulators or factors that are beyond its control. In May, the merger was conditionally approved by CCS.

As of May 2026, there were 8,223 public charging points.

== Domestic manufacturing ==
Dyson initially planned to build an electric car manufacturing plant in Singapore but eventually cancelled the plans in October 2019.

In 2020, Hyundai set up a Hyundai Motor Group Innovation Centre (HMGICS) in Jurong Innovation District within Jurong. The centre also contains an electric vehicle manufacturing plant, the first in Singapore. The center was completed at a cost of $400 million in January 2023. It was originally expected to be completed by November 2022 but was delayed by the COVID-19 pandemic in Singapore. As of May 2025, the center manufactured four electric cars, Hyundai Ioniq 5 and 6, Hyundai Ioniq 5 robotaxi and also Kia EV5.

== Sales ==
As of September 2021, the Tesla Model 3 was the best-selling electric car in Singapore.

In 2021, there were 2,942 electric vehicles, 0.45 percent of the car population, in Singapore.

In September 2022, EV registrations were about 19% of all new car registrations.

By the end of 2022, there were 6,531 electric vehicles registered in Singapore, equivalent to 1% of all vehicles in the country. As of May 2023, there were 7,961 electric vehicles registered in Singapore, equivalent to 1.2% of all vehicles in the country. BYD overtook Tesla to become the top-selling EV brand in Singapore.

By the first quarter of 2025, 4,383 electric vehicles were registered in Singapore, comprising 40.2 per cent of total car registrations. Of the new electric cars, the top three brands were BYD (with 2,183 cars sold), Tesla (with 413) and BMW (with 361).

As of November 2025, there were 46,029 electric vehicles, an increase to seven percent of the car population. The first three quarters of the year also saw new electric vehicles registration increased slightly to 43 percent of all car registrations.

== Transit ==
In March 2022, there were 60 electric public buses in use with plans to convert half of Singapore’s public bus fleet (5,800 buses in March 2022) to be electric buses by 2030.

In addition, private bus operators such as Singapore Ducktours will also purchase 3 electric LARC-V vehicles and 10 open-top Wright StreetDeck Electroliner buses.

Taxis operators of Singapore also planned to have half of Singapore’s taxi fleet (around 15,000 taxis in March 2022) to change to electric taxis by 2030. Land Transport Authority had extended the statutory lifespan of electric taxis from 8 to 10 years to let operators recover their investment in electric taxis.

== Government ==
In 2020, during the Budget Speech by Deputy Prime Minister Heng Swee Keat, calculation of road tax for cars will be revised with reduction of the tax for electric vehicles and certain hybrid vehicles. He also mentioned that as the increase of electric vehicles would reduce fuel excise duties collected by the government, an additional tax would be imposed on the road tax for electric vehicles. Despite the additional tax, Heng said electric vehicle owners would still save more money due to other government schemes. The LTA said the additional tax, additional flat component, will be S$700 for electric vehicles registered from 2021 onwards while existing owners will pay the additional tax in stages. (Note: Click on Car after reaching the reference)

On 10 February 2021, the government released the Singapore Green Plan 2030 which includes the installation of up 60,000 electric vehicle charging points. It had also announced that by 2030, pure internal combustion engines (ICE) vehicles will be banned from registration.

In July, the government offers rebates via the Electric Vehicle Common Charger Grant for charging station installations equivalent to 50% of the cost of installation, capped at S$4,000 for 2,000 charging stations. The grant expires on 1 January 2024 or when grants for 2,000 chargers had been awarded.

As of October 2022, the Singaporean government offers tax rebates of up to S$45,000 for electric vehicle purchases. As of November 2022, the government offers a 45 percent rebate, capped at $15,000, on car registration fees for electric cars. In 2024, LTA announced that LTA will continue the 45 percent rebate for electric car till end of 2025 while National Environment Agency will also continue the maximum rebate of $25,000 for cars under the Vehicular Emissions Scheme (VES).

On 8 September 2025, LTA announced the extension of tax rebates for purchases of electric vehicles, though at a lower rate, till end of 2026. Rebate under VES will be reduced to a maximum of $20,000 and limited to electric vehicles while EV Early Adoption Incentive will be reduced from $15,000 to $7,500.
