= Tanjong Rhu =

Subzone of Kallang Planning Area in Central Region

- Subzone of Kallang Planning Area

Other transcription(s)
  - Chinese: 丹戎禺; Dān róng yú (Pinyin)
  - Malay: Tanjung Rhu (Rumi) تنجوڠ رو (Jawi)
  - English: Tanjong Rhu, Rhu Point, (formerly) Sandy Point
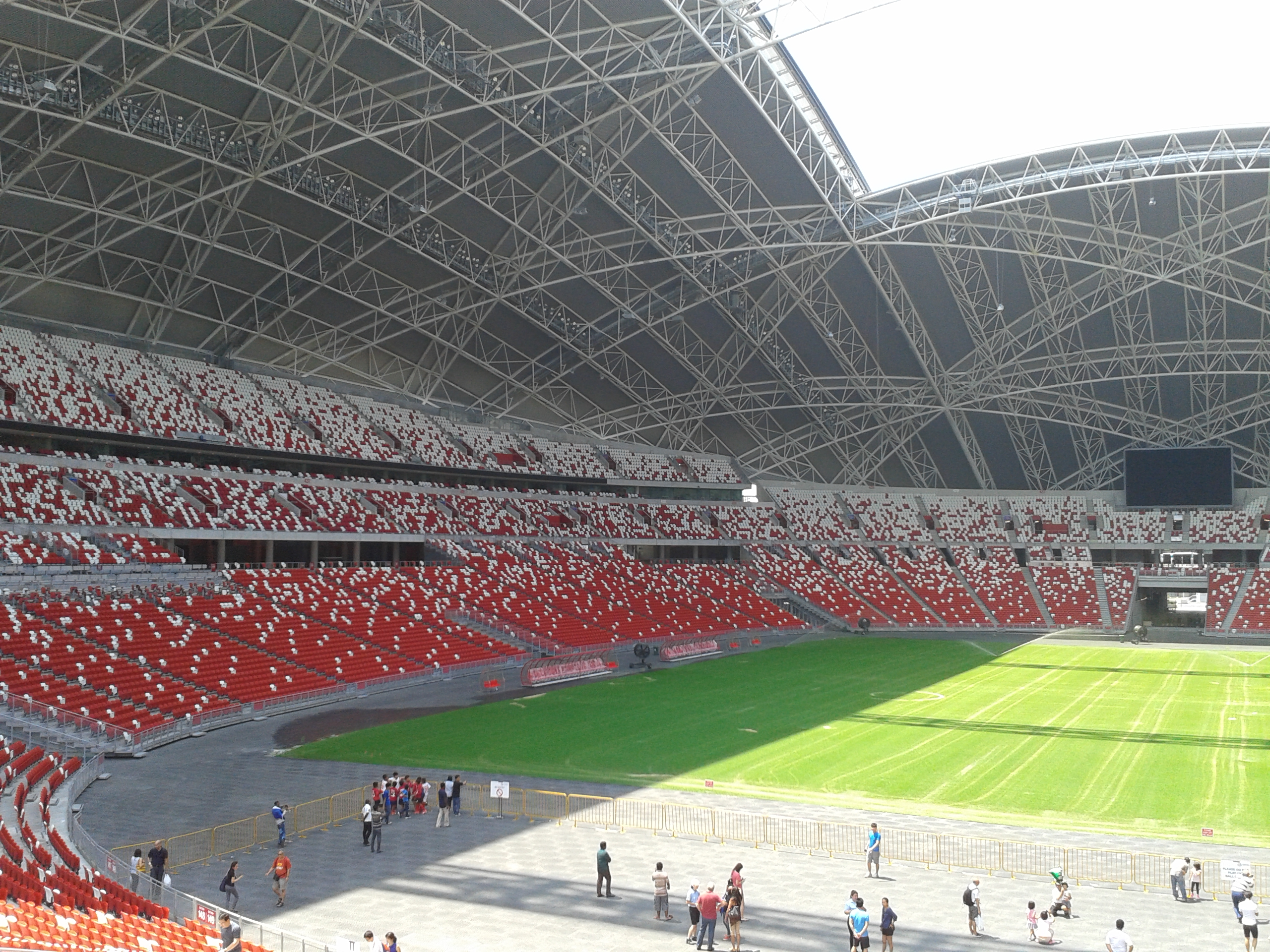
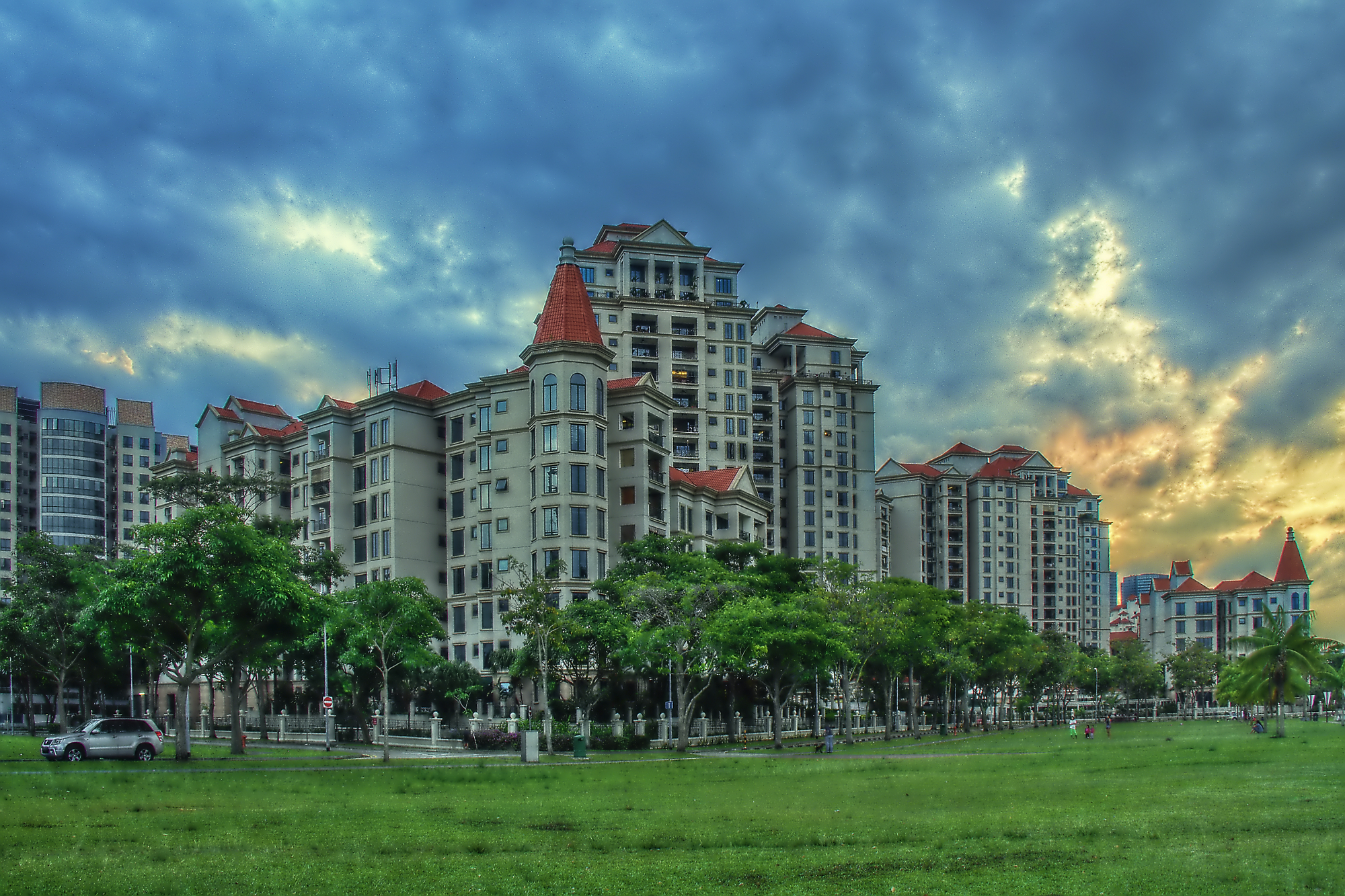
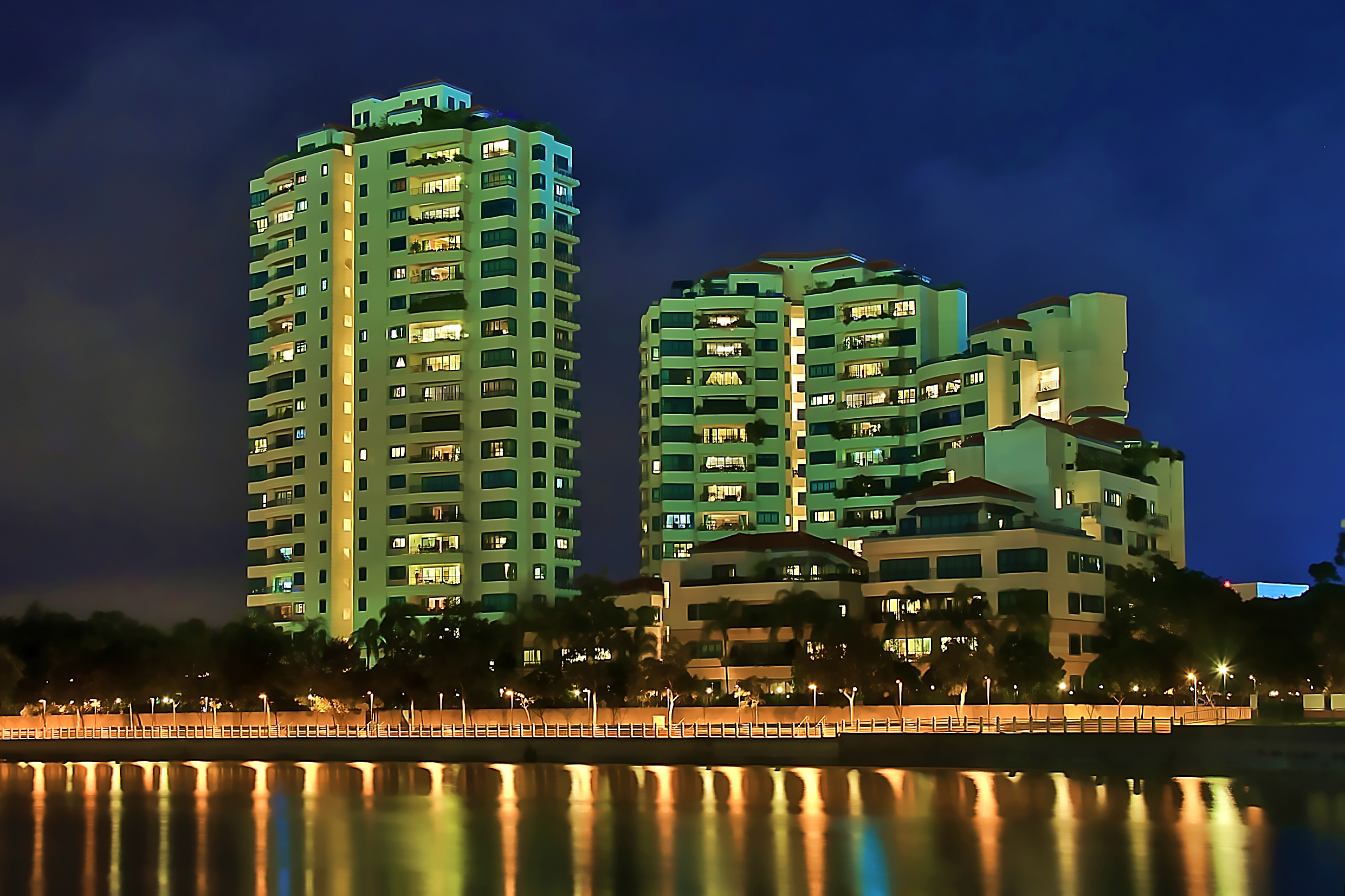
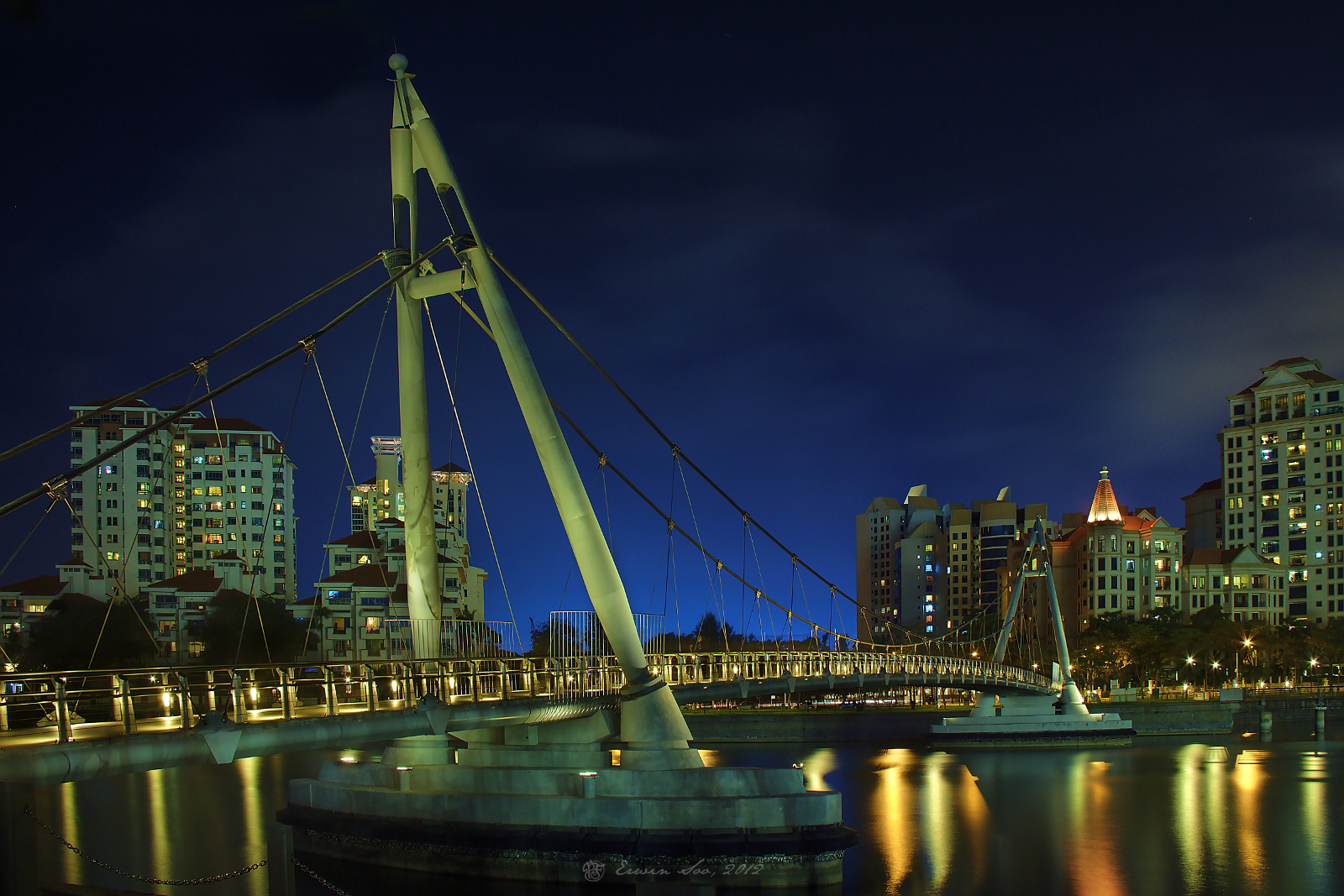
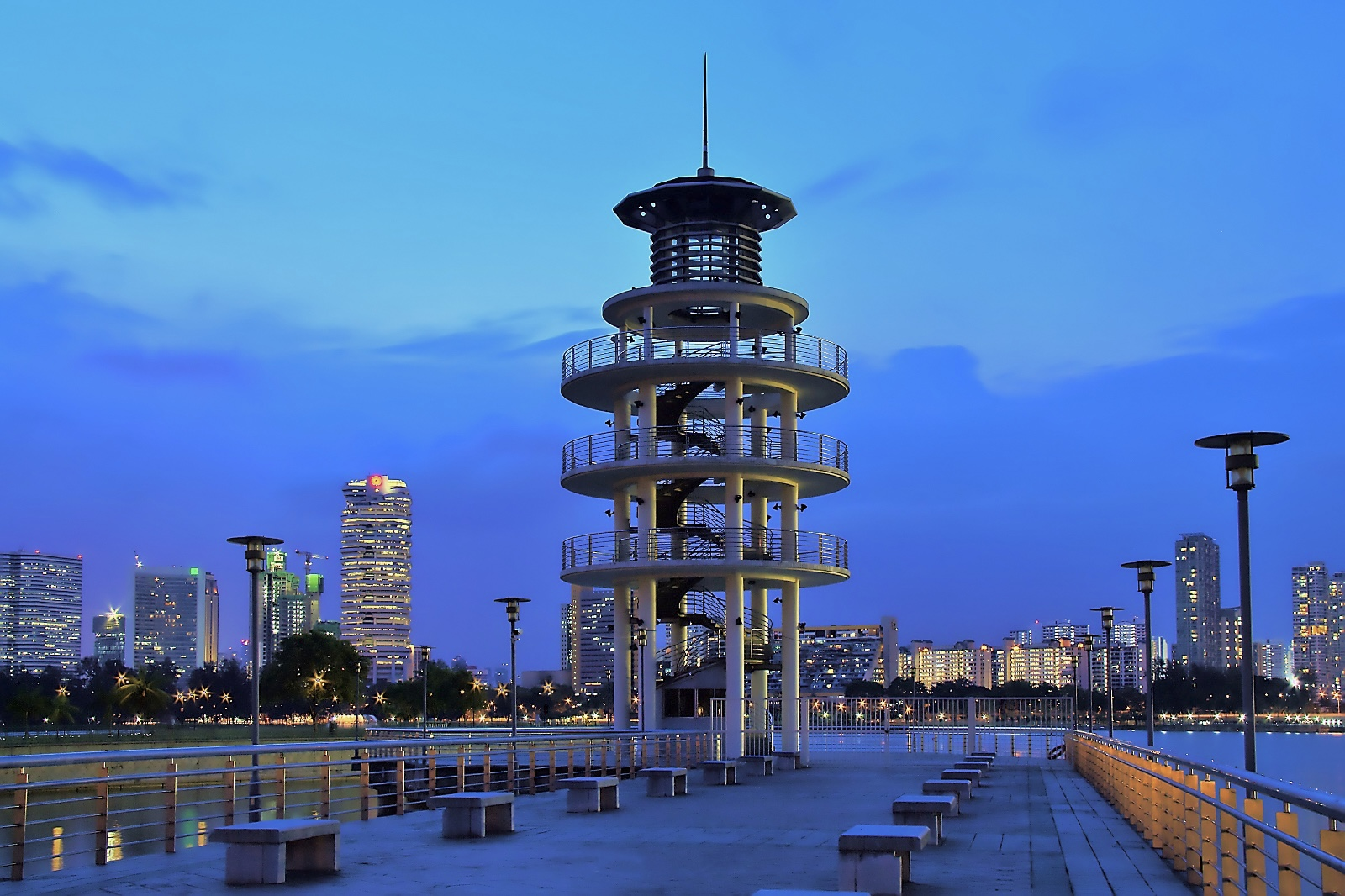
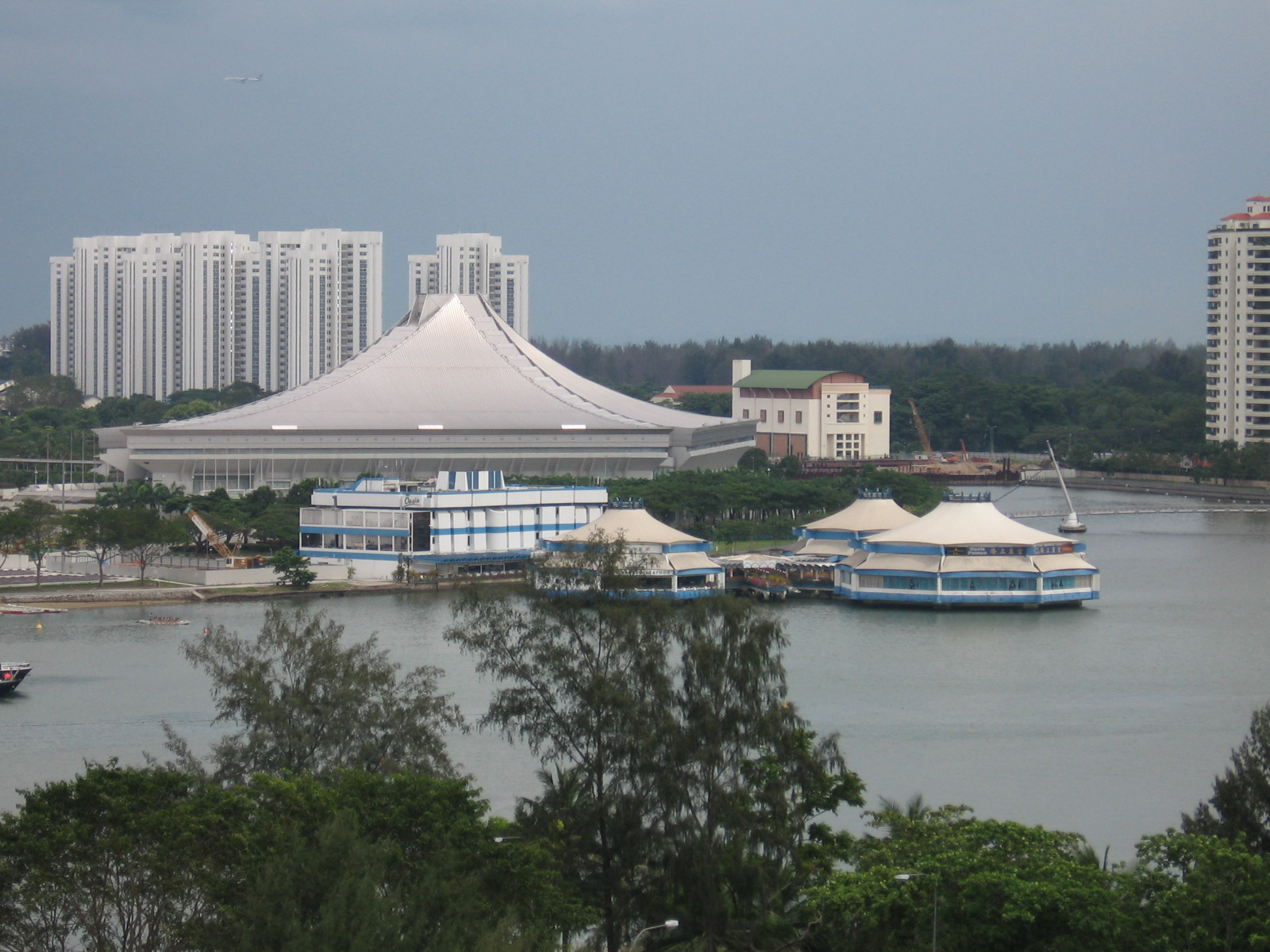
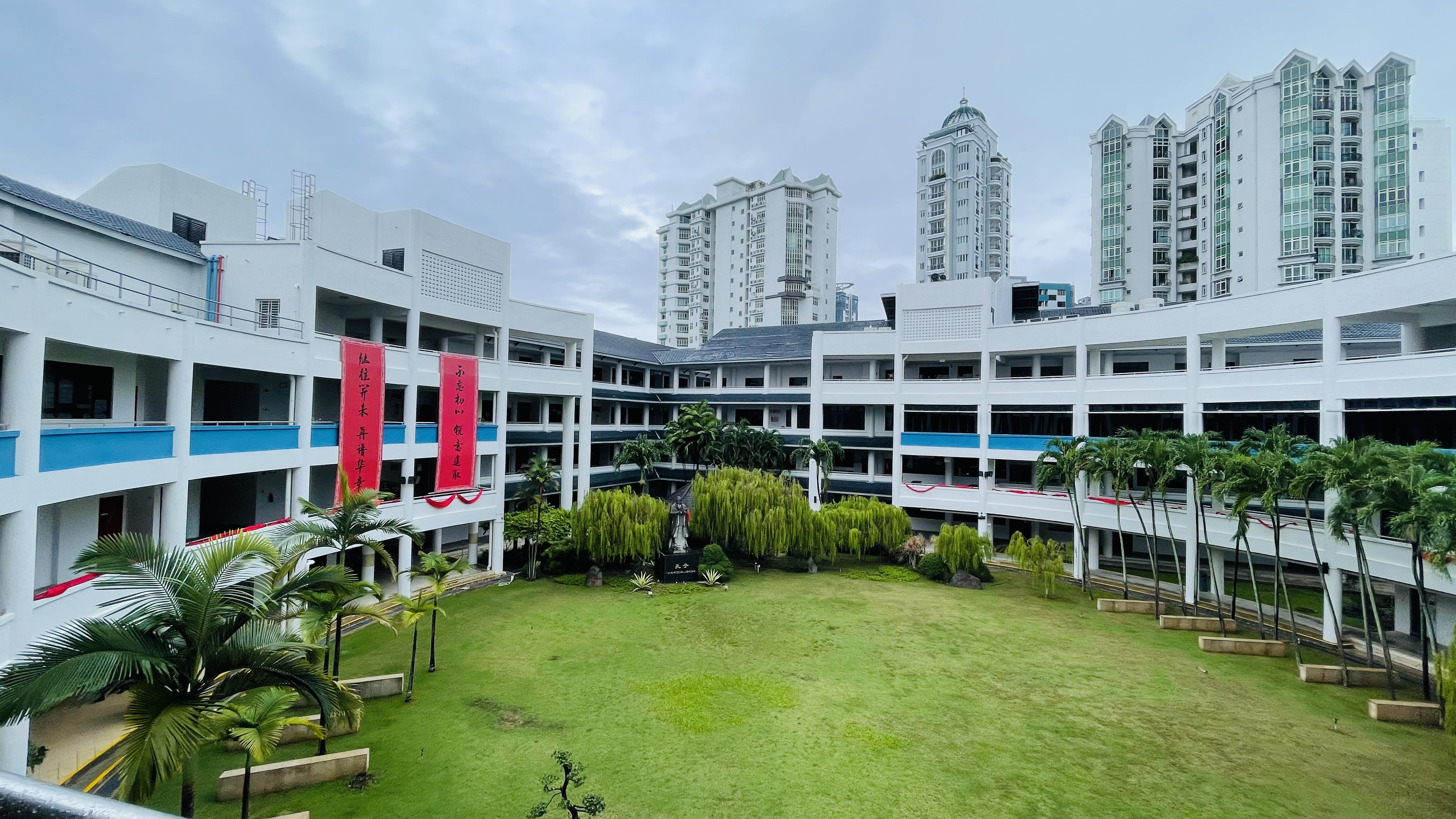
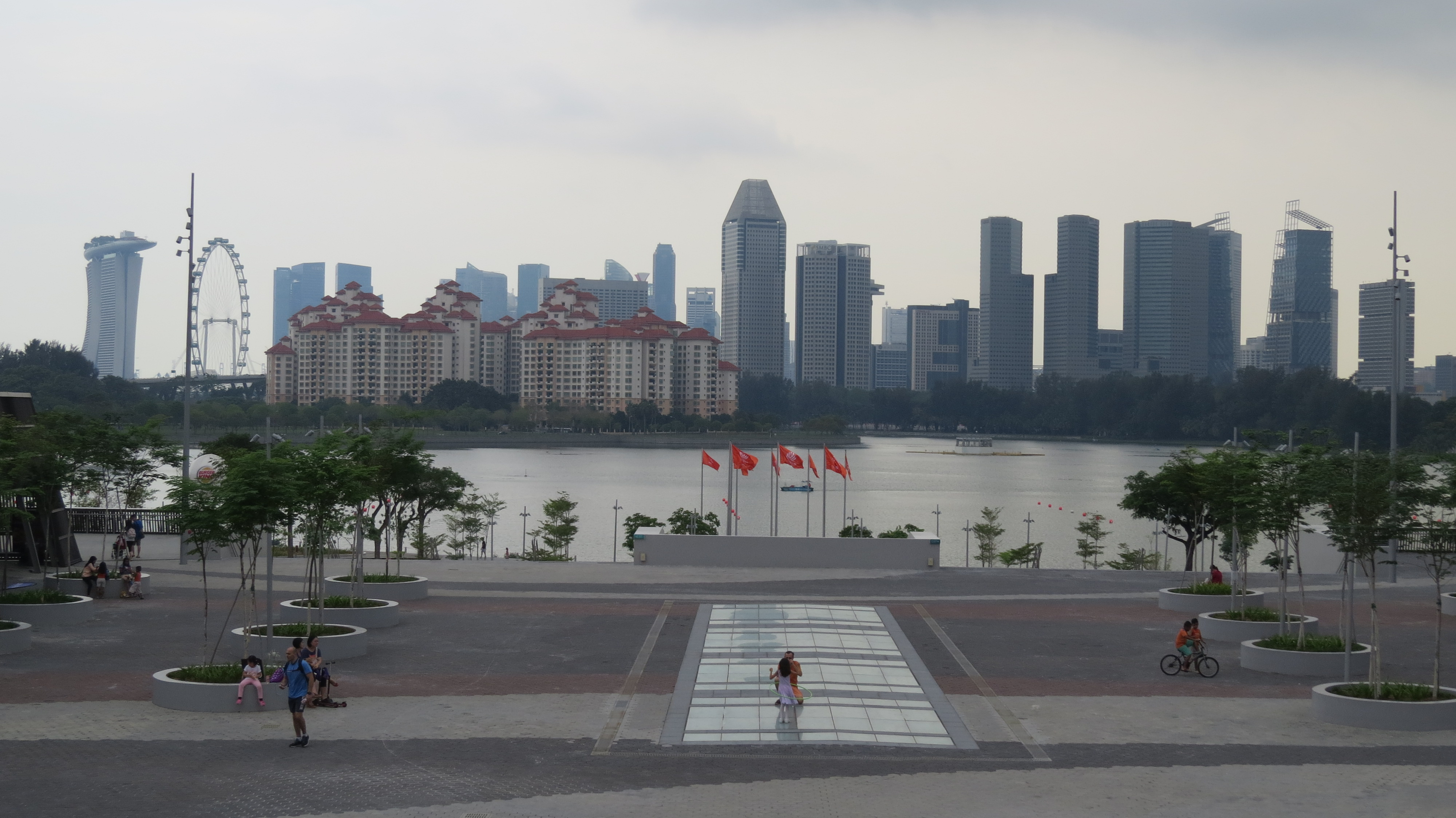
- Row 1: National Stadium; Row 2, left: Pebble Bay condominiums Row 2, right: Camelot By-The-Water condominiums Row 3, left: Tanjong Rhu Suspension Bridge across the Geylang River; Row 3, right: Lookout tower at Kallang Basin; Row 4, left: Singapore Indoor Stadium and the old Oasis building Row 4, right: Dunman High School; Row 5: Singapore Sports Hub overlooking the Kallang Basin and Central Area
- Interactive map of Tanjong Rhu
- Coordinates: 1.3011°N 103.8685°E
- Country: Singapore
- Region: Central Region
- Planning Area: Kallang

Population (2025)
  - Total: 11,560

Tanjong Rhu (Note: "Rhu" is an informal local name that refers to the casuarina equisetifolia which grew along the area.) (IPA: /ruː/; formerly Sandy Point; Chinese: 丹戎禺; Tamil: தஞ்சோங் ரூ) is a subzone within the planning area of Kallang, Singapore, as defined by the Urban Redevelopment Authority (URA). The perimeter of Tanjong Rhu is made up of Nicoll Highway in the north; Mountbatten Road and Fort Road in the east; East Coast Parkway (ECP) in the south; as well as Marina Channel and Kallang Basin in the west. Tanjong Rhu is the largest in terms of physical area among the nine subzones that make up Kallang.

Consisting of residential, commercial and recreational developments, Tanjong Rhu is famous for being the location of the Singapore Sports Hub, which includes the Kallang Wave Mall, new National Stadium and the Singapore Indoor Stadium. Previously, the old National Stadium which hosted a total of 18 National Day Parades sat on the land now occupied by the new National Stadium. The former Kallang Airport once extended into this area, with part of its old runway being the modern-day Stadium Boulevard.

Other sports facilities in Tanjong Rhu include the Kallang Tennis Centre, Kallang Field, Kallang Ground, Kallang Track, Kallang Netball Centre, Kallang Squash Centre and PAssion WaVe @ Marina Bay. Notable places include Kallang Theatre, Leisure Park Kallang, Mountbatten Fire Post, Katong Community Centre, Singapore Swimming Club, the Benjamin Sheares Bridge and Dunman High School, one of Singapore's leading educational institutions.

Tanjong Rhu is also a residential neighbourhood, made up of mostly condominiums and private housing along Tanjong Rhu Road. A few blocks of public housing built by the Housing and Development Board (HDB) exist along Kampong Arang Road and Kampong Kayu Road. These residential estates are connected to the Singapore Sports Hub via Stadium Way, across the Geylang River.

== Etymology ==
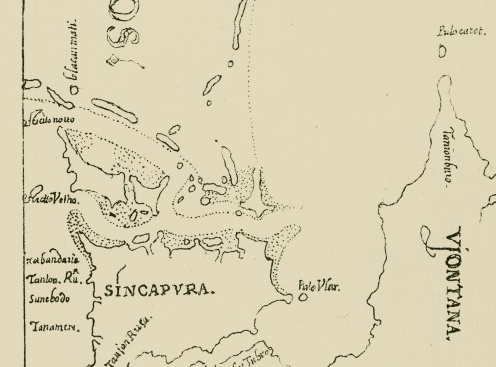
Tanjong Rhu (left) marked as Tanjon Rû in this 1604 map of Singapore by Godinho de Erédia. The map is orientated with the South towards the top left.

The name Tanjong Rhu appeared in Manuel Godinho de Erédia's 1604 map of Singapore spelt as Tanjon Rû, it means "casuarina cape" in Malay from the trees of Casuarina equisetifolia or almost similar C. littoria (ru or rhu) species that grew along the beach between Kallang and Rochor. It was known as sha tsui (沙咀) in Cantonese, which means "sand spit".

== History ==
Tanjong Rhu has been associated with ship building and repairing from the early days. Captain William Flint, a harbour master, started a boat building and repair company here in 1822. Thomas Tivendale had his (Wilkinson, Tivendale and Company) shipyard here in the 1860s. The shipyard would be acquired by John I. Thornycroft & Company in 1926 and close in 1986 by successor Vosper Thornycroft Pte Singapore.

As late as the 1980s and the early 1990s, the Tanjong Rhu area was an industrial area with shipyards. The water surrounding Tanjong Rhu was polluted with industrial and domestic waste, creating an extremely unpleasant environment. A massive relocation exercise was then undertaken by the Singapore Government to transform Tanjong Rhu into a high-end residential area. Reclamation of land along the Tanjong Rhu coast began as early as 1992. Private developers then started the new luxury residential developments in Tanjong Rhu. Today, the shipyards have since been relocated elsewhere and condominiums have replaced them.

In September 1993, 12 men were arrested in an entrapment operation in Tanjong Rhu coined the "Fort Road Incident". The operation, which targeted homosexual men, led to charges of "outrage of modesty". Six of the men pleaded guilty and were sentenced to three strokes of the cane each and imprisonment ranging from two to six months. The names, ages and occupations of all 12 men were published in all major Singaporean newspapers. The operation has been noted for its controversial nature due to its entrapment tactics and harsh punishment of homosexual individuals. Those were the last reported cases of such police entrapment. A short 19-minute 2009 film, "The Casuarina Cove" by Boo Junfeng told the story of one of those men.

== Residential developments ==
=== HDBs ===
Years Built	Project name	Street	Blocks
1984	Di Tanjong Rhu	Kampong Kayu Road	1
1969–1970	Di Tanjong Rhu	Jalan Batu	2-9
1986	Di Tanjong Rhu	Jalan Batu	10-11
2029	Tanjong Rhu Riverfront I	Sampan Place	24-25
2029	Tanjong Rhu Riverfront II	Kampong Arang Road	26-28
2029	Tanjong Rhu Parc Front	Tanjong Rhu Road	31-33

=== Condominiums ===
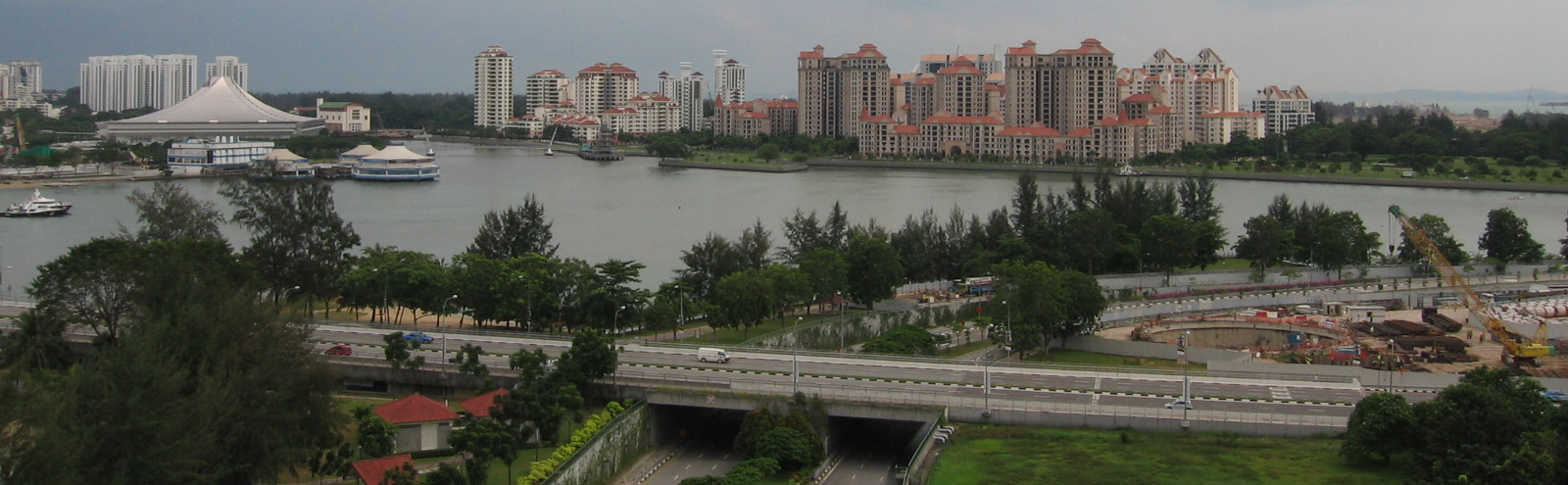
The high-end private residential developments at Tanjong Rhu form the backdrop for this panorama of the Kallang Basin area in the eastern part of Singapore.

- Costa Rhu
- Pebble Bay
- Fort Gardens
- Water Place
- Sanctuary Green
- Parkshore
- Tanjong Ria
- Camelot By The Water
- Casuarina Cove
- The Waterside
- The Line @ Tanjong Rhu
- Fulcrum
- Crystal Rhu
- La Ville

== Public transport ==
=== Mass Rapid Transit (MRT) ===
Tanjong Rhu is served by four MRT stations, spread across two lines, namely the Circle Line and the Thomson–East Coast line. The stations are:

- CC6 Stadium
- CC7 Mountbatten
- TE23 Tanjong Rhu
- TE24 Katong Park

=== Bus ===
Tanjong Rhu is also served by the public trunk bus services 11 and 158, which connect the neighbourhood to different parts of Singapore. Bus 11 cuts across the Tanjong Rhu Bridge and connects residents to Kampong Bugis and Geylang, while Bus 158 connects residents to Mountbatten, Geylang, MacPherson and Serangoon.
