= Jalan Benaan Kapal =

Name transcription(s)
  - Malay: Jalan Benaan Kapal
- Interactive map of Jalan Benaan Kapal
- Coordinates: 1.3026°N 103.8785°E
- Country: Singapore

Jalan Benaan Kapal (Chinese: 惹兰百纳安克巴) is a minor road in Kallang, Singapore. Running along the northern bank of the Geylang River near to the river mouth at Kallang Basin, Jalan Benaan Kapal is within the close proximity of The Kallang, Leisure Park Kallang, Kallang Theatre and Stadium MRT station.

== Etymology ==
"Jalan Benaan Kapal" is in the Malay language. Jalan translates to "road"; Benaan is the archaic form of binaan, meaning "construction" or "building"; and Kapal is "ship".

== History ==
Before modern developments took place in Kallang, Jalan Benaan Kapal was the site of a cluster of shipbuilding and ship repairing factories, hence its name. It was Singapore's first purpose-built marine industrial estate, before the area was converted into a sporting and recreational precinct.

Jalan Benaan Kapal used to be one continuous road, stretching from Stadium Road to Mountbatten Road. With the construction of the old National Stadium, it was later shortened.

Today, Jalan Benaan Kapal exists in two unlinked parts, as a result of the construction of Stadium Way and Tanjong Rhu Bridge. The main part runs from Mountbatten Road to Stadium Way, while a short stretch is situated off Stadium Crescent. The latter is closed off from public access.
