= Kallang Basin =

Bay in Kallang, Singapore

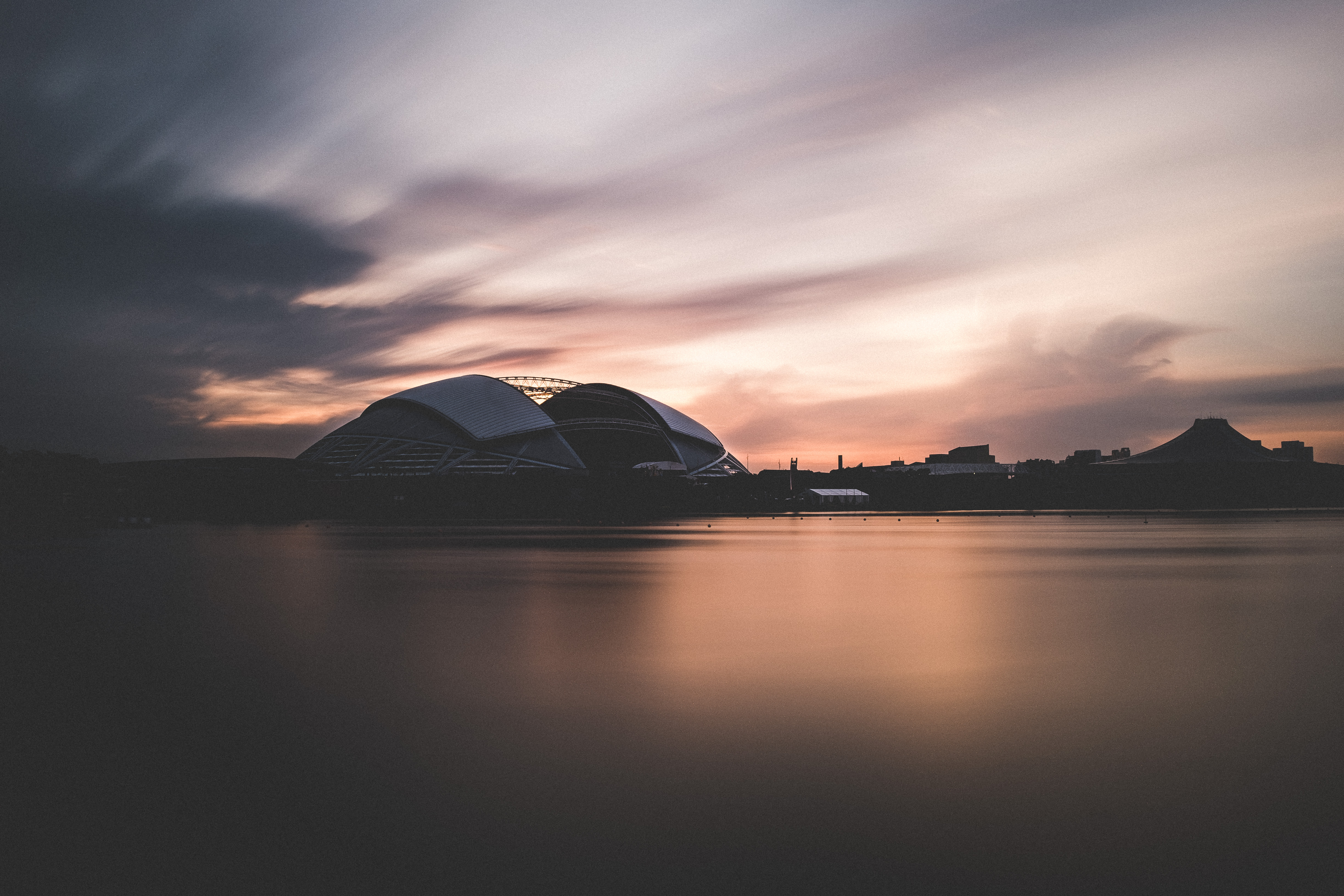
The new National Stadium across the Kallang Basin during sunset hours.

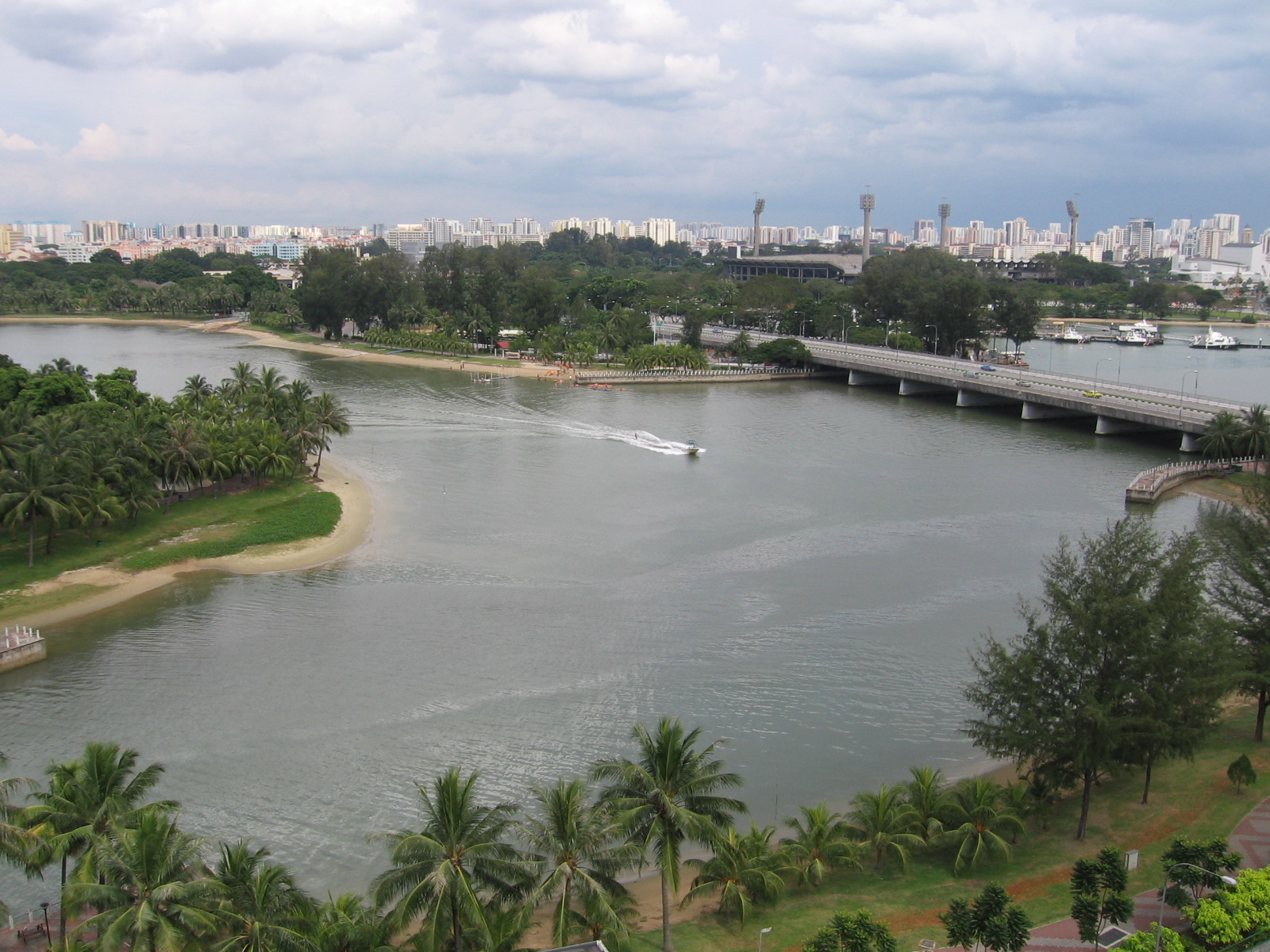
The Kallang Basin with the Merdeka Bridge on the right and the old National Stadium in the background.

Kallang Basin (Chinese: 加冷盆地; Malay: Lembangan Kallang) is an enclosed bay in Kallang, Singapore. The Kallang River, Rochor River and Geylang River empty into the Kallang Basin. The Marina Channel connects the Kallang Basin with the Singapore Straits.

Currently, the Kallang Basin is part of the Marina Reservoir, as are the rivers that flow into the Kallang Basin and their tributaries. The reservoir has a catchment size of nearly one-sixth of mainland Singapore's land area. The Kallang Basin is a popular location for water sports, in particular, kayaking and dragon boating.

Today, the area surrounding the body of water is also frequently called Kallang Basin. The term has been applied to the industrial estates along Kallang Bahru, the Kallang Basin Swimming Complex, amongst others.

== Landmarks ==
=== Modern landmarks ===
- Singapore Sports Hub
  - National Stadium
  - Singapore Indoor Stadium
  - Kallang Wave Mall
- Kallang Theatre
- Leisure Park Kallang
- Kallang Riverside Park
- Conserved complex of the former Kallang Airport
- Tanjong Rhu Lookout Tower
- Tanjong Rhu Suspension Bridge
- Golden Mile Complex
- Merdeka Bridge
- Nicoll Highway MRT station
- Stadium MRT station

=== Former landmarks ===
- Old National Stadium
- Kallang Gasworks
- Kallang Park
- Former headquarters of the Police Coast Guard and Marine Division

=== Condominiums ===
- Costa Rhu
- Tanjong Ria
- Casuarina Cove
- Camelot By-The-Water
- Pebble Bay
- Parkshore
- Water Place
- Sanctuary Green

== History ==
=== Landscape ===
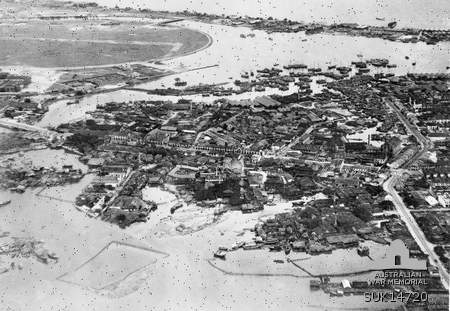
The much larger Kallang Basin before the land reclamation of Kallang. The Kallang Airport is seen in the background.

Much of the lands around Kallang Basin are the result of extensive land reclamation. Areas of the modern-day Singapore Sports Hub, the former Kallang Airport, the condominium clusters along Tanjong Rhu Road, the industrial estate at Kallang Bahru, and the area south of Nicoll Highway were once part of a much larger Kallang Basin prior to land reclamation. Numerous islands also existed in the Kallang Basin, including Pulau Mengalu which was located at where modern-day Bendemeer MRT station is. At its greatest extent, the Kallang Basin once extended as far north as today's Bendemeer Road.

From the late 1960s to early 1970s, the part of Kallang Basin to the north of Kallang Road underwent land reclamation. The Kallang River and its tributaries were also canalised to prevent flooding.

The Kallang Basin area once formed part of mainland Singapore's southeastern coastline. Its access to the Singapore Straits was only cut off when the Marina Barrage was completed over the Marina Channel in 2008.

=== Clean-up ===
In 1977, a massive ten-year-long clean-up project was embarked by the Singapore Government at the Kallang Basin and the nearby Singapore River, transforming them into the clean bodies of water today.

=== Raffles' landing ===
While the Raffles' Landing Site on the northern bank of the Singapore River is generally thought to be the original landing spot of Sir Stamford Raffles in 1819, other sources point to the Kallang Basin area as the likely location. According to the Cho Clan Archives, Raffles ordered his ship's carpenter, Chow Ah Chi, to lead the way in posting the British East India Company flag on mainland Singapore and he supposedly landed at the mouth of the Rochor River in Kallang. Raffles, following the route taken by Chow, also arrived at the Kallang Basin in what is today's Kallang Riverside Park. This was possible because the Kallang Basin was directly connected to the open sea at the time of Raffles' founding of modern Singapore.
