= Kallang Park =

Park in Kallang, Singapore

Coordinates: 1°18′15.4″N 103°52′28.6″E

- Interactive map of Kallang Park
- Location: Kallang, Singapore
- Opened: 18 October 1959; 67 years ago
- Closed: 1970; 56 years ago
- Status: Demolished

Kallang Park (Chinese: 劳动公园, Malay: Taman Kallang) was a large public park located in Kallang, Singapore. It existed from 1959 to the early 1970s on the site currently occupied by the Singapore Sports Hub.

== Etymology ==
Kallang Park was so named because it was built on the site of the former Kallang Airport runway, on the eastern bank of the Kallang Basin. The area is now part of the Kallang planning area.

Its Chinese name "劳动公园", however, translates to "labour park". Its Malay name "Taman Kallang" is a translation based on the English version.

== History ==
Plans to convert the lands of the former Kallang Airport into public spaces were first announced by then-Minister for National Development Ong Eng Guan as "Project Long" in the 1950s. It was constructed with the involvement of both the government and volunteers. The park was officially opened on 18 October 1959 by Parliamentary Secretary to the Ministry of Labour and Law Wee Toon Boon.

In July 1969, the Wonderland Amusement Park was integrated into the Kallang Park, with the construction costing an estimated S$3 million. In 1970, Singapore's largest cinema at that time, the Kallang Cinema (now the Kallang Theatre), was built in the Kallang Park.

By 1973, the former National Stadium was erected at the site of the Kallang Park.

Today, the same site has been redeveloped into the Singapore Sports Hub, consisting of the new National Stadium, Singapore Indoor Stadium and numerous other sports facilities. The name "Kallang Park" is now preserved in the row of godowns along Jalan Benaan Kapal.

== Facility ==
Kallang Park had entertainment facilities for both adults and children, including kart racing, agriculture shows, roller coaster, ferris wheel, nightclub, bowling centre and ice skating rink, among others. Its most notable feature, however, was perhaps a fountain gifted by the Singapore Chinese Chamber of Commerce and Industry, noted for its futuristic design.
