= Tanjong Rhu Bridge =

Bridge in Tanjong Rhu, Singapore

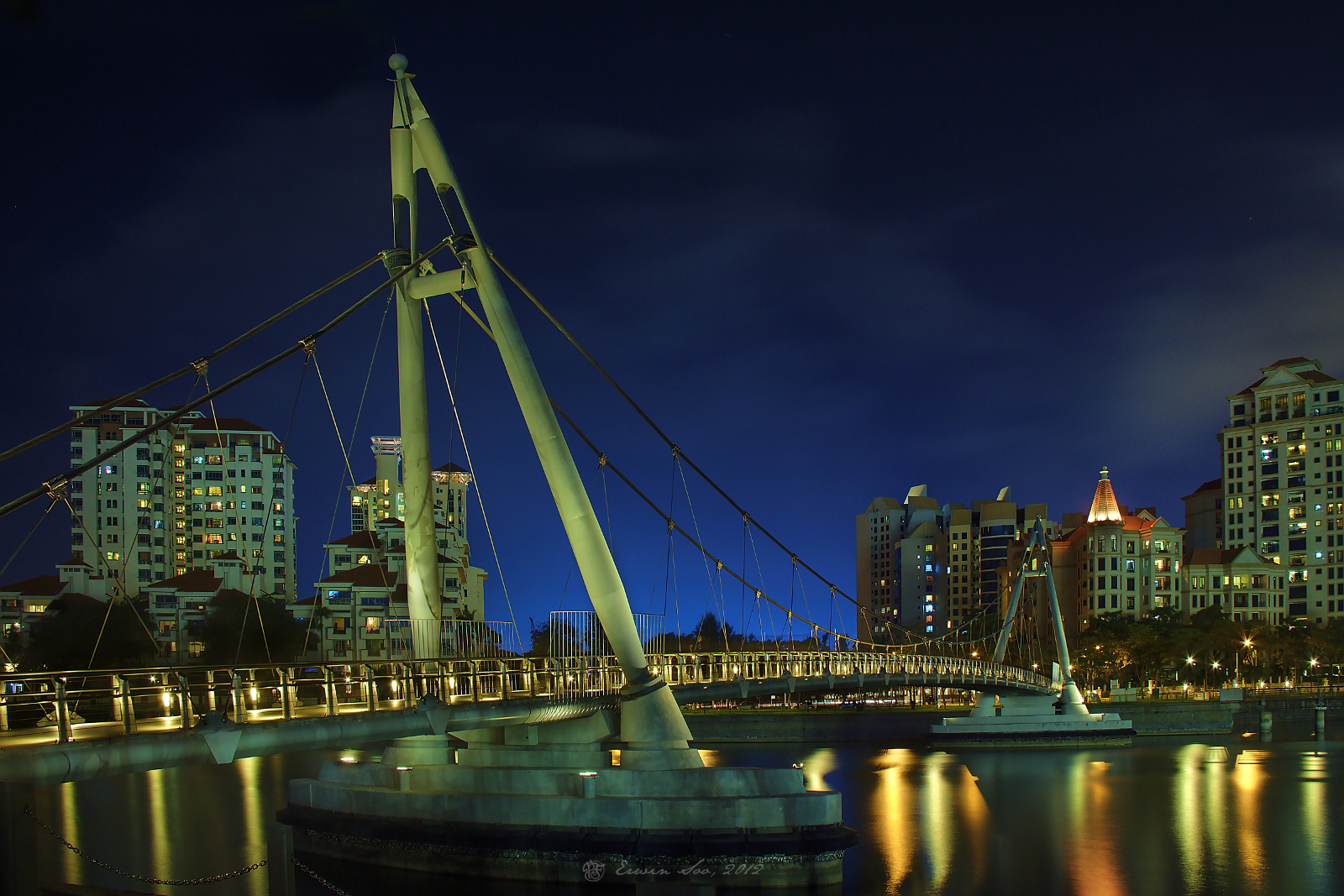
- Tanjong Rhu Bridge at night
- Coordinates: 1°17′57″N 103°52′26″E
- Carries: Pedestrians
- Crosses: Geylang River
- Locale: Tanjong Rhu
- Begins: Tanjong Rhu Promenade
- Ends: Singapore Sports Hub
- Owner: Land Transport Authority
- Maintained by: Land Transport Authority

Characteristics
- Material: Steel and concrete
- Total length: 180m
- Width: 4m
- Height: 19m
- Longest span: 2
- No. of spans: 102
- No. of lanes: 1

History
- Designer: Public Works Department
- Engineering design by: Murray North (SEA) Ltd.
- Construction start: 1996; 30 years ago (expected)
- Construction end: July 1998; 28 years ago
- Construction cost: $5.1-million SDG
- Opening: 4 August 1998; 28 years ago

Location
- Interactive map of Tanjong Rhu Bridge

Tanjong Rhu Bridge, also known as the Tanjong Rhu Footbridge, is a footbridge spanning over the Geylang River in Tanjong Rhu, Singapore. Opened in July 1998, it connects residents of various condominiums near the Tanjong Rhu Promenade to facilities in the Singapore Sports Hub, such as the National Stadium, the Singapore Indoor Stadium, the Water Sports Centre near the Kallang Basin, and other facilities.

== History ==
External Media
- Model for Tanjong Rhu Footbridge Source: The Straits Times

Tanjong Rhu was a shipyard hub until 1985 when the Singapore government forced the shipyards to either move to Jurong, close down, or comply with strict pollution regulations.

As part of the URA's plans to redevelop the Tanjong Rhu area, it was announced in December 1997 that the S$5.1 million (US$3.05 million) bridge was to be designed by the Public Works Department with assistance from engineering firm Murray North (SEA) Ltd and restressing works by OVM Prestress, an associate company of Wee Poh Holdings who was awarded the S$460,000 (1997) (US$309,804.82) contract for the prestress. Construction was expected to start in 1996 and was completed in July 1998. The bridge was officially opened on 4 August 1998, by Koo Tsai Kee, parliamentary secretary for the Ministry of National Development.

== Details ==
Tanjong Rhu Bridge is a steel suspension footbridge that is 180 metres (590 ft) long, with its deck being 130 metres (430 ft) long and 4 metres (13 ft) wide. It has a 19 metres (62 ft) tall A-frame tower located on both ends of the bridge that connects the two 4.5 inches (11 cm) thick main suspension cables to each side. Connected to the suspension cables are a hundred 1 inch (2.5 cm) thick hangar cables which also connects to the bridge's deck.

It was designed to be a suspension bridge for aesthetics rather than functionality. Normally, suspension bridges are used for wide rivers, though the PWD chose a suspension bridge design as they planned for it to be a point of interest in Tanjong Rhu, essentially "a mini-version of other famous suspension bridges in San Francisco and New York". The bridge connects the Tanjong Rhu to the Singapore Sports Hub.
