= Geylang River =

River in Singapore

Coordinates: 1°18′N 103°52′E

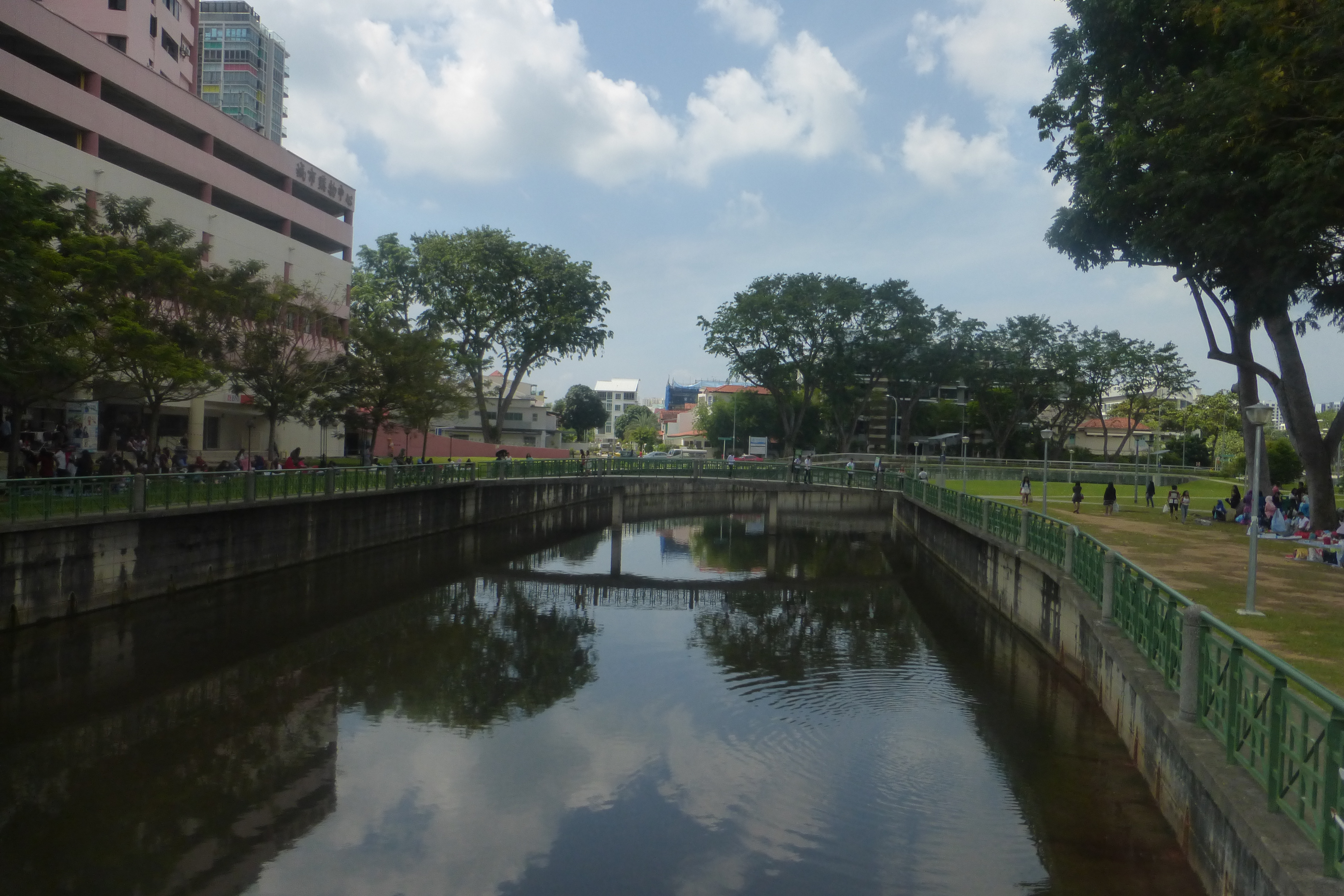
The river in March 2017

Geylang River (Malay: Sungai Geylang; Simplified Chinese: 芽茏河) is a canalised river flowing from Geylang to Kallang, in the Central Region of Singapore. With the formation of the Marina Reservoir after the completion of the Marina Barrage in 2008, the river now forms part of the reservoir.

== Course ==
Geylang River begins at Ubi as Geylang Canal, continues southwards under Eunos Road 5 and Sims Avenue, and turns westwards after Geylang Road and Lorong 40 Geylang, but flows southwards again near Guillemard Road, before turning westwards again after the junction of Old Airport Road and Dunman Road, through Mountbatten Road and Stadium Way. The river finally empties into the Kallang Basin near Tanjong Rhu in the southern part of Kallang near the Tanjong Rhu Suspension Bridge.

== History ==
Geylang River underwent a two-year revitalisation under the Public Utilities Board's (PUB) Active, Beautiful, Clean (ABC) Waters Programme. The project transformed the former concrete canal into a more attractive and community-friendly waterway while preserving the area's rich cultural heritage through heritage-inspired landscaping and design elements. The rejuvenated Geylang River was officially opened by Guest-of-Honour Associate Professor Fatimah Lateef, Member of Parliament for Marine Parade Group Representation Constituency. As part of the revamp, Geylang River was also deepened and widened to increase its capacity and enhance flood protection. As part of ABC Waters project by Paya Lebar Quarter, a natural rain garden which treats surface runoff using plants and soil was also set up to improve the quality of the river's water.

The Geylang Park Connector of the Park Connector Network (PCN) runs almost parallel to the Geylang River, providing a stretch of recreational space along the river between Guillemard Road and Tanjong Rhu. The Paya Lebar Quarter straddles both sides of the Geylang River.

== Otters ==
Geylang River is known to be frequented by smooth-coated otters, as it has become a thriving habitat due to efforts like the PUB's Active, Beautiful, Clean (ABC) Waters Programme. These otters are often seen swimming and playing, and even have "otter crossing" signs along the riverbanks as a reminder of their presence.
