= National Day Rally =

Annual message delivered by the Prime Minister of Singapore to the entire nation

The National Day Rally (NDR) (Chinese: 国庆群众大会; pinyin: Guóqìng Qúnzhòng Dàhuì; Malay: Rapat Umum Hari Kebangsaan; Tamil: தேசிய தின பேரணி) is an annual message delivered by the Prime Minister of Singapore to the entire nation, on the first or second Sunday after National Day on 9 August. Started in 1966, the national day rally is Singapore's equivalent of the President of the United States’ State of the Union address. The prime minister uses the rally to review the country’s status, its key challenges, as well as to set the country's direction, major policy changes, the economy, future plans and achievements. Currently, the prime minister does the rally speech in all of its official languages, English, Mandarin and Malay (national language), except for Tamil, where only dubbing is available from its English broadcast.

== History ==
The first National Day Rally (NDR) was held as a "private meeting" at the National Theatre between Prime Minister Lee Kuan Yew and several grassroots leaders on the eve of the first National Day back on 8 August 1966, with a copy of the transcript releasing to public media two weeks later. According to Lee, his intention to hold a rally with his reason: "Every year, on this 9th August for many years ahead—how many, I do not know—we will dedicate ourselves anew to consolidate ourselves to survive; and, most important of all, to find an enduring future for what we have built and what our forebears will build up".

Beginning in the subsequent year, the rally has been held within weeks after the National Day. By 1971, the NDR was broadcast live for the first time ever; Lee told that the live broadcast was a last-minute decision and viewed it as "a fixture on the political calendar".

The NDR was held at six different venues since its first iteration in 1966, four being held as permanent venues. The first permanent venue was the National Theatre until 1983, where the theatre was demolished the following year. After two years of holding its rally at the Singapore Conference Hall, the Kallang Theatre hosted its rally as its second permanent venue between 1986 and 2000. The University Cultural Centre at the National University of Singapore was the third permanent venue for the NDR which was held between 2001 and 2012. Since 2013, the NDR was held at its new permanent venue at the Tay Eng Soon Convention Centre in the ITE College Central.

In 2020, in-light of the COVID-19 pandemic, the NDR was cancelled for the first time ever, and then-Prime Minister Lee Hsien Loong instead delivered it during his opening speech in conjunction with the opening of 14th Parliament on 2 September 2020. In 2021, the NDR was held at the Mediacorp one-north campus instead. The NDR resumed its permanent venue at ITE College Central in 2022 following the improvement of the pandemic situation.

The NDR was previously held under closed-doors. In 1981, several cabinet ministers were allowed in attendance and in rare cases (such as in 1981 and 2012), were given speeches. Attendance expanded to allow the opposition and Nominated MPs to attend the rally since around 2007. Since 2012, a real-time sign-language interpretation was also included in the broadcast.

== Format ==
=== Broadcast ===
The National Day Rally first broadcast as a two-hour live special from 8pm to 10pm. Since 2005, the rally has been expanded to commence at 6.45pm starting with the Chinese and Malay language being delivered first, followed by an intermission before the English language speech is delivered starting at 8.15pm (originally 8pm prior to 2017). Originally broadcast among the Mediacorp channels, but as of 2016, the rally is also simulcast on YouTube and its Mediacorp's live television streaming service meWatch.

On rare occasions, some English speeches may end earlier or later due to the overrun, with some programmes showing immediately after the English rally ended, or when its original date being scheduled in advance to avoid a schedule conflict. In 2008, the English rally was postponed to the following day to allow the broadcast of the Table Tennis final women's match between Singapore and China in the 2008 Summer Olympics. 2010 and 2012 had it pushed to the last Sunday of August that month to avoid clash with the 2010 Summer Youth Olympics and the Ramadan festivities, respectively. In 2021, it was originally planned for the speech to be delivered on 22 August, but was postponed to a week later.

| Platform/Language | English Dubbing in English | Mandarin Dubbing in Mandarin | Malay Dubbing in Malay | Dubbing in Tamil |
|---|---|---|---|---|
| TV | Channel 5 CNA (8pm-10pm) | Channel 8 Channel U | Suria | Vasantham |
| Radio | CNA938 | Capital 95.8FM | Warna 94.2FM | Oli 96.8FM |
| Online | CNA Live meWATCH | meWATCH (Chinese) | - | - |

From 2001 to 2004, the rally was also broadcast on the now-defunct SPH MediaWorks' channels, and from 2009 to 2018 (except for 2016) on Mediacorp Okto.

=== Transcripts ===
Transcripts of the rally speech are usually available for viewing after the event at Mediacorp news portals, Singapore Press Holdings news portals, the website of the Prime Minister's Office and the online press centre of the Government of Singapore. Highlights of the speeches will usually be reported by Singapore newspapers in the following days.

== List of rallies ==
| Year | Date | Venue | Speaker | Transcript |
|---|---|---|---|---|
| 1966 | 8 August 1966 (Monday) | National Theatre | Lee Kuan Yew | |
| 1967 | 16 August 1967 (Wednesday) | National Theatre | Lee Kuan Yew | |
| 1968 | 16 August 1968 (Friday) | National Theatre | Lee Kuan Yew | |
| 1969 | 16 August 1969 (Saturday) | National Theatre | Lee Kuan Yew | |
| 1970 | 16 August 1970 (Sunday) | National Theatre | Lee Kuan Yew | |
| 1971 | 15 August 1971 (Sunday) | National Theatre | Lee Kuan Yew | |
| 1972 | 13 August 1972 (Sunday) | National Theatre | Lee Kuan Yew | |
| 1973 | 26 August 1973 (Sunday) | National Theatre | Lee Kuan Yew | |
| 1974 | 18 August 1974 (Sunday) | National Theatre | Lee Kuan Yew | |
| 1975 | 17 August 1975 (Sunday) | National Theatre | Lee Kuan Yew | |
| 1976 | 15 August 1976 (Sunday) | National Theatre | Lee Kuan Yew | |
| 1977 | 14 August 1977 (Sunday) | National Theatre | Lee Kuan Yew | |
| 1978 | 13 August 1978 (Sunday) | National Theatre | Lee Kuan Yew | |
| 1979 | 19 August 1979 (Sunday) | National Theatre | Lee Kuan Yew | |
| 1980 | 17 August 1980 (Sunday) | National Theatre | Lee Kuan Yew | |
| 1981 | 16 August 1981 (Sunday) | National Theatre | Lee Kuan Yew | |
| 1982 | 15 August 1982 (Sunday) | National Theatre | Lee Kuan Yew | |
| 1983 | 14 August 1983 (Sunday) | National Theatre | Lee Kuan Yew | |
| 1984 | 19 August 1984 (Sunday) | Singapore Conference Hall | Lee Kuan Yew | |
| 1985 | 18 August 1985 (Sunday) | Singapore Conference Hall | Lee Kuan Yew | |
| 1986 | 17 August 1986 (Sunday) | Kallang Theatre | Lee Kuan Yew | |
| 1987 | 16 August 1987 (Sunday) | Kallang Theatre | Lee Kuan Yew | |
| 1988 | 14 August 1988 (Sunday) | Kallang Theatre | Lee Kuan Yew | |
| 1989 | 20 August 1989 (Sunday) | Kallang Theatre | Lee Kuan Yew | |
| 1990 | 26 August 1990 (Sunday) | Kallang Theatre | Lee Kuan Yew | |
| 1991 | 11 August 1991 (Sunday) | Kallang Theatre | Goh Chok Tong | English |
| 1992 | 16 August 1992 (Sunday) | Kallang Theatre | Goh Chok Tong | English |
| 1993 | 15 August 1993 (Sunday) | Kallang Theatre | Goh Chok Tong | English |
| 1994 | 21 August 1994 (Sunday) | Kallang Theatre | Goh Chok Tong | English |
| 1995 | 20 August 1995 (Sunday) | Kallang Theatre | Goh Chok Tong | English |
| 1996 | 18 August 1996 (Sunday) | Kallang Theatre | Goh Chok Tong | English |
| 1997 | 24 August 1997 (Sunday) | Kallang Theatre | Goh Chok Tong | English |
| 1998 | 23 August 1998 (Sunday) | Kallang Theatre | Goh Chok Tong | English |
| 1999 | 22 August 1999 (Sunday) | Kallang Theatre | Goh Chok Tong | English |
| 2000 | 20 August 2000 (Sunday) | Kallang Theatre | Goh Chok Tong | English |
| 2001 | 19 August 2001 (Sunday) | University Cultural Centre | Goh Chok Tong | English |
| 2002 | 18 August 2002 (Sunday) | University Cultural Centre | Goh Chok Tong | English |
| 2003 | 17 August 2003 (Sunday) | University Cultural Centre | Goh Chok Tong | English |
| 2004 | 22 August 2004 (Sunday) | University Cultural Centre | Lee Hsien Loong | English |
| 2005 | 21 August 2005 (Sunday) | University Cultural Centre | Lee Hsien Loong | English |
| 2006 | 20 August 2006 (Sunday) | University Cultural Centre | Lee Hsien Loong | English |
| 2007 | 19 August 2007 (Sunday) | University Cultural Centre | Lee Hsien Loong | Malay · Chinese · English |
| 2008 | 17 August 2008 (Sunday) | University Cultural Centre | Lee Hsien Loong | English |
| 2009 | 16 August 2009 (Sunday) | University Cultural Centre | Lee Hsien Loong | English |
| 2010 | 29 August 2010 (Sunday) | University Cultural Centre | Lee Hsien Loong | English |
| 2011 | 14 August 2011 (Sunday) | University Cultural Centre | Lee Hsien Loong | English |
| 2012 | 26 August 2012 (Sunday) | University Cultural Centre | Lee Hsien Loong | English |
| 2013 | 18 August 2013 (Sunday) | ITE College Central | Lee Hsien Loong | English |
| 2014 | 17 August 2014 (Sunday) | ITE College Central | Lee Hsien Loong | Malay · Chinese · English |
| 2015 | 23 August 2015 (Sunday) | ITE College Central | Lee Hsien Loong | Malay · Chinese · English |
| 2016 | 21 August 2016 (Sunday) | ITE College Central | Lee Hsien Loong | Malay · Chinese · English (part 1 · part 2) |
| 2017 | 20 August 2017 (Sunday) | ITE College Central | Lee Hsien Loong | Malay · Chinese · English |
| 2018 | 19 August 2018 (Sunday) | ITE College Central | Lee Hsien Loong | Malay · Chinese · English |
| 2019 | 18 August 2019 (Sunday) | ITE College Central | Lee Hsien Loong | Malay · Chinese · English |
| 2020 | Cancelled due to the COVID-19 pandemic | | | |
| 2021 | 29 August 2021 (Sunday) | Mediacorp Campus | Lee Hsien Loong | Malay · Chinese · English |
| 2022 | 21 August 2022 (Sunday) | ITE College Central | Lee Hsien Loong | Malay · Chinese · English |
| 2023 | 20 August 2023 (Sunday) | ITE College Central | Lee Hsien Loong | Malay · Chinese · English |
| 2024 | 18 August 2024 (Sunday) | ITE College Central | Lawrence Wong | Malay · Chinese · English |
| 2025 | 17 August 2025 (Sunday) | ITE College Central | Lawrence Wong | Malay · Chinese · English |
| 2026 | 23 August 2026 (Sunday) | ITE College Central | Lawrence Wong | Malay · Chinese · English |

== Response ==
An article titled "Singapore's National Day Rally Speech: A Site of Ideological Negotiation" analyses the inaugural National Day Rally speeches of three Singapore prime ministers. It locates these speeches in the continuous ideological work that the PAP government has to do to maintain consensus and forge new alliances among classes and social forces that are being transformed by globalisation. Increasingly, these speeches have had to deal with the contradictions between nation-building and the tensions between the liberal and reactionary tendencies of the global city.

According to Kenneth Paul Tan of the Lee Kuan Yew School of Public Policy, he stated that "the rally speech has also been a part of larger celebrations surrounding the commemoration of Singapore's independence gained on 9th August 1965. These celebrations have come to include a short and formal televised National Day message from the prime minister, observance ceremonies held at organisations in the public and private sectors, constituency dinners and ministerial speeches, regularly televised music videos of patriotic songs composed for the celebrations, and—most spectacular of all—a National Day parade that since the mid-1980s has included not only a traditional ceremonial segment, but also high-tech mass performances and re-enactments of the official "Singapore Story" that end on a climax of fireworks". He added that "Clearly the symbolic and formal aspects of the speech are just as important as its contents, taking Singaporeans collectively to an emotional high. This is especially so during general election years, when the prime minister announces the PAP's "report card" of achievements in government as well as the distribution of election "goodies" to the Singaporean masses—the lower income voters in particular—as a way of reinforcing the image of government as benevolent provider".

As an annual injection of patriotism, the National Day celebrations help to inoculate Singaporeans against the disenchantment that accompanies advanced industrial societies, whether they are formally classified as capitalist or socialist, democratic or authoritarian. Singaporeans are reminded every year of the PAP's pioneer leaders—Lee Kuan Yew and his "lieutenants".

The PAP knows that its authority will be secure as long as it remains able to make Singaporeans believe that it can continue to deliver material prosperity and security for all, regardless of race. Therefore, the PAP has had to reassert its relevance constantly by insisting on Singapore's fundamentally vulnerable nature and condition, an insistence that has sustained a culture of fear and arrested the risky global environment, the PAP also knows that the transactional basis on which its authority is built has become fragile and therefore needs to be strengthened by moral authority.
