= The Kallang =

Sports district in Singapore

Coordinates: 1°18′15″N 103°52′29″E

- The Kallang (Malay); 加冷汇 (Chinese); த காலாங் (Tamil)

- View of The Kallang near Jalan Benaan Kapal, including Singapore Indoor Stadium, Leisure Park Kallang, and National Stadium.
- Interactive map of The Kallang
- Location: Kallang, Singapore
- Operator: Sport Singapore
- Capacity: National Stadium: 55,000; Indoor Stadium: 12,000; OCBC Aquatic Centre: 6,000; OCBC Arena: 3,000
- Public transit: CC6 Stadium; EW10 Kallang; TE23 Tanjong Rhu

Construction
- Groundbreaking: 29 September 2010
- Opened: 30 June 2014 (Soft launch); 26 July 2015 (Officially)
- Cost: S$1.3 billion (est.)
- Architects: Arup Architecture (National Stadium and Sports Venues), DP Architects (Non-Sport Venues, QP), AECOM (landscape)

Website
- www.thekallang.com.sg www.sportshub.com.sg

The Kallang, (Note: Malay: The Kallang; Chinese: 加冷汇; Tamil: த காலாங்.) formerly the Singapore Sports Hub (Note: Malay: Hab Sukan Singapura; Chinese: 新加坡体育城; Tamil: சிங்கப்பூர் விளையாட்டு நடுவம்.) and commonly referred to as the Sports Hub, (Note: Malay: Hub Sukan; Chinese: 体育城.) is a large sports complex located in Kallang, Singapore. Spanning about 35 hectares (86 acres), the development is anchored by the new National Stadium and the existing Singapore Indoor Stadium, an aquatics centre, an indoor sports hall, a water sports centre, a range of public sporting facilitiesm and the Kallang Wave Mall. It opened to the public on 30 June 2014.

== History ==
=== Early years and construction ===
The Sports Hub project was firstly proposed on the recommendation of then Community Development and Sports Minister Abdullah Tarmugi in Parliament in 2001. His proposal was based on a report by the Committee of Sporting Singapore calling for the city-state to promote a culture of sports, and replace the aging National Stadium.

The Sports Hub was to include the new stadium, new aquatic centre, indoor arena, and recreation facilities. Alpine Mayreder, Singapore Gold Consortium, and the Singapore Sports Hub Consortium (SSHC) submitted bids for the project, which included the new National Stadium and its surrounding facilities, in February 2007. On 19 January 2008, the Singapore government awarded the development of the Sports Hub project to SSHC, led by Dragages Singapore Pte Ltd. Minister of Community Development, Youth and Sports Vivian Balakrishnan stated that their bid "displayed significant strengths in programming, team culture and partnership, functionality and layout".

The Sports Hub was a public-private partnership with Sports Hub Pte Ltd.(SHPL), a consortium consisting of InfraRed Capital Partners, Dragages Singapore, DTZ Facilities and Engineering and Global Spectrum Asia. Under the 25-year agreement, the consortium designed, built, financed and operated the Sports Hub, while Sport Singapore paid roughly SG$193.7 million per-year to cover management costs.

The demolition of the former National Stadium was slated to begin in 2008 while the construction of the new Sports Hub was originally planned for completion in 2011. Due to the 2008 financial crisis and high construction costs, the project was delayed. In 2008, barring any major problems, it was projected that the project would be completed in time for the 2013 Southeast Asian Games. However, after delays were announced in 2009, Singapore withdrew from hosting the Games. In August 2010, it was reported that the contract to begin construction had been signed with plans for the demolition works of the former National Stadium to start in October 2010 and for the completion of the new Sports Hub in April 2014. The demolition of the National Stadium started with a groundbreaking ceremony on 29 September 2010.

The contract with SHPL began around 2010 and was intended until 2035. Naming rights to some of the Sports Hub's facilities were sold to various partners, with OCBC Bank sponsoring its indoor arena and aquatic centre, and 100plus sponsoring an 888 m (971 yd) promenade around the new National Stadium.

The Sports Hub's facilities were officially opened to the public on 30 June 2014, and began to host events over the year that followed, including the 2015 Southeast Asian Games. Prime Minister Lee Hsien Loong officially inaugurated the facility on 26 July 2015 during the Youth Day event Youth Celebrate! at the National Stadium.

=== Nationalisation, redevelopment ===
In 2019, a redevelopment plan for the wider Kallang precinct known as "Kallang Alive" was announced as part of Sport Singapore's Vision 2030. It sought to build additional facilities to compliment the Sports Hub, including a football centre, a tennis centre, a "youth centre" with a speed climbing wall and a velodrome, redeveloping the Kallang Theatre as a sport facility, building a new walkway and cycling path system to link the Sports Hub to the Park Connector Network, and redeveloping the waterfront along Jalan Benaan Kapal as greenspaces.

On 10 June 2022, it was announced that Sport Singapore had reached a mutual agreement with SHPL to exit the partnership, with a subsidiary of Sport Singapore assuming ownership and management of the Singapore Sports Hub beginning 9 December 2022. SportSG CEO Lim Teck Yin stated that ending the agreement with SHPL would give it more flexibility, while chairman Kon Yin Tong stated that it would allow more synergies with the Kallang Alive project, and allow the Sports Hub to "keep up with the times and competitive landscape as well as the new needs of the nation." Sport Singapore paid a termination fee based on the complex's market value and outstanding construction debt; while the exact cost was not disclosed at the time of the announcement, it was stated that when combined with future operating costs, Sports Singapore would have paid just as much to SHPL (SG$2.32 billion) over the remaining years of the contract.

On 9 December 2022, Sport Singapore took over operations of the Sport Hub via the subsidiary Kallang Alive Sport Management Co Pte Ltd. On 18 August 2024 during the National Day rally, Prime Minister Lawrence Wong announced plans for the re-location of the Singapore Sports School to the district, and a new indoor arena at the Sports Hub as part of the Kallang Alive project. It will be constructed next to the existing Singapore Indoor Stadium, and have a capacity of 18,000; Wong stated that the development would "unlock [the Sports Hub's] full potential".

In November 2025, the precinct was officially renamed The Kallang, alongside an announced renovation of the Kallang Wave Mall expected to be completed in 2028. The management company was also renamed The Kallang Group. Chairman Keith Magnus explained that the goal was for the precinct to be "a place where global acts, local heroes and everyday Singaporeans unite to share unforgettable experiences that strengthen our national fabric".

== Facilities ==
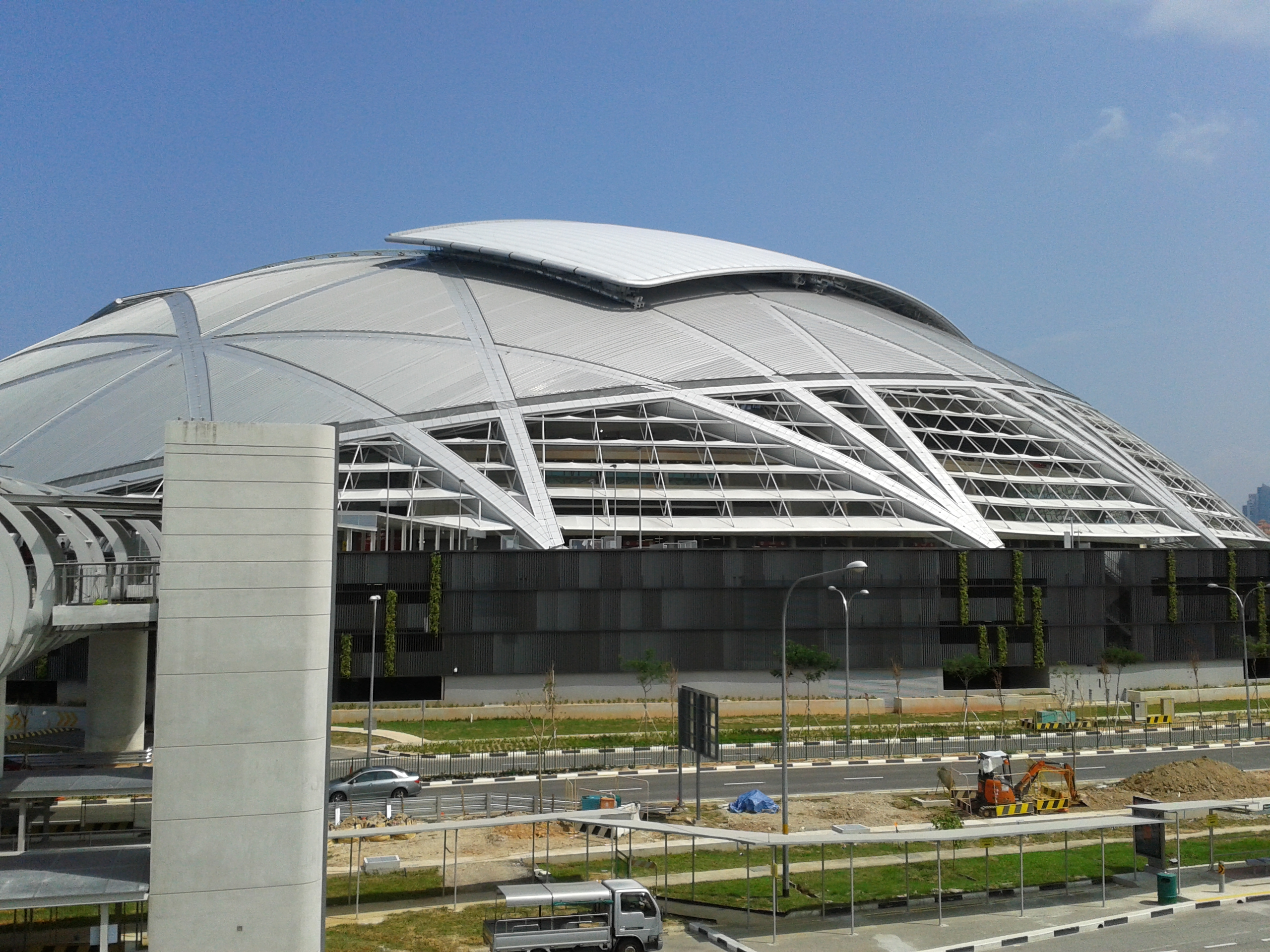
Singapore National Stadium from Kallang Footbridge

The 35-hectare Singapore Sports Hub includes the following sports facilities:

- A 55,000-capacity National Stadium with a retractable roof and movable tiered seating
- Singapore Indoor Stadium, an existing 12,000-seat indoor arena
- OCBC Aquatic Centre, which features two Olympic-size swimming pools for training and competition, and a diving facility. It has hosted FINA events, and is the headquarters of the Singapore Swimming Association. It has 3,000 permanent seats, but can also be expanded to 6,000 seats if needed.
- OCBC Arena, an indoor sports facility.
- The Water Sports Centre, a kayaking and canoeing facility along the Kallang Basin.
- Various community facilities, including basketball, netball, and volleyball courts, as well as running and cycling paths,

It also includes the Singapore Sports Museum, the Sports Hub Library, Shimano Cycling World (a cycling museum operated by bike manufacturer Shimano), and Kallang Wave Mall (a shopping centre attached to the National Stadium featuring stores, restaurants, a 16 m (52 ft) climbing wall, and a children's water park on its roof).

== Gallery ==
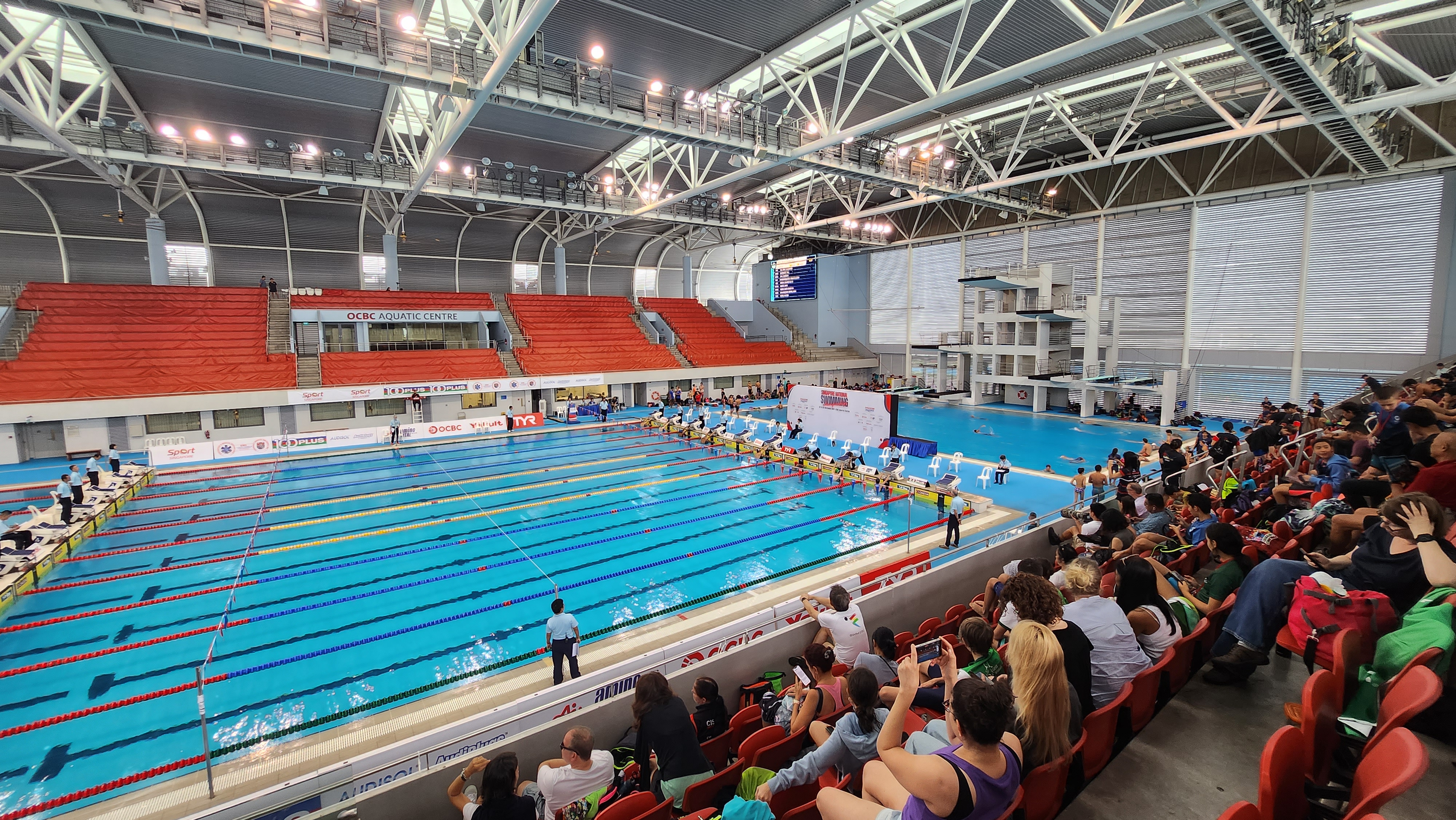
OCBC Aquatic Centre

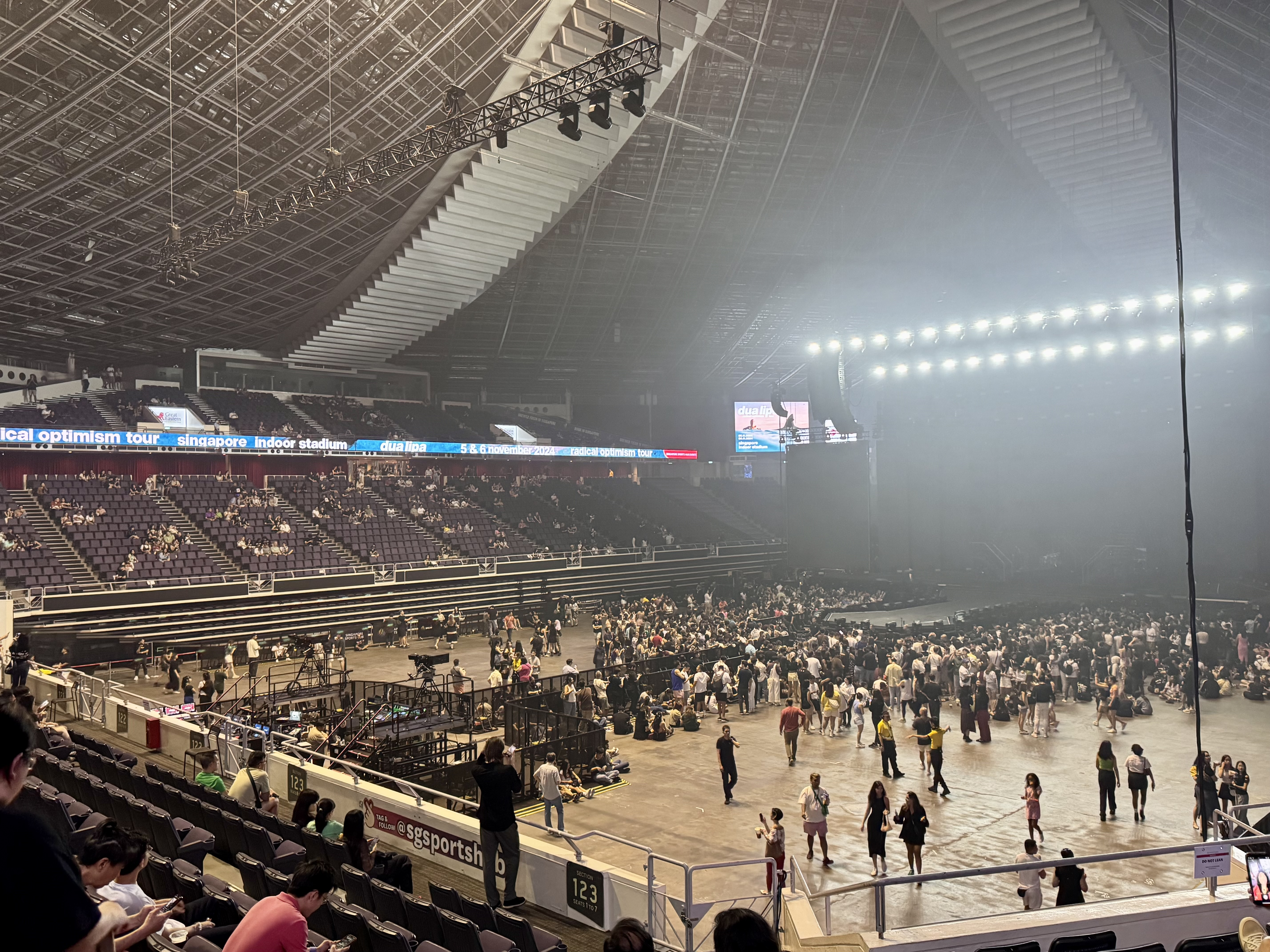
Singapore Indoor Stadium

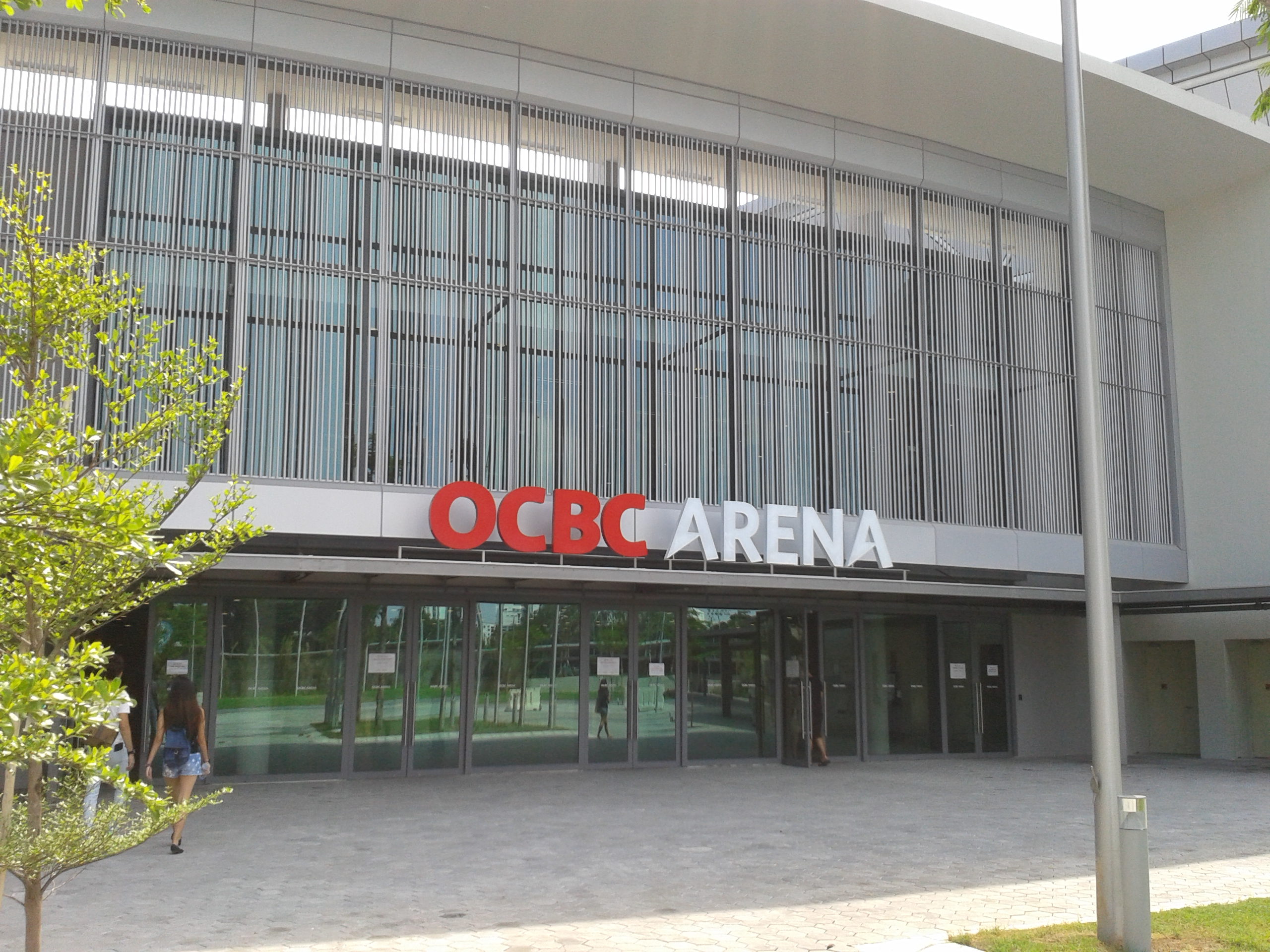
OCBC Arena

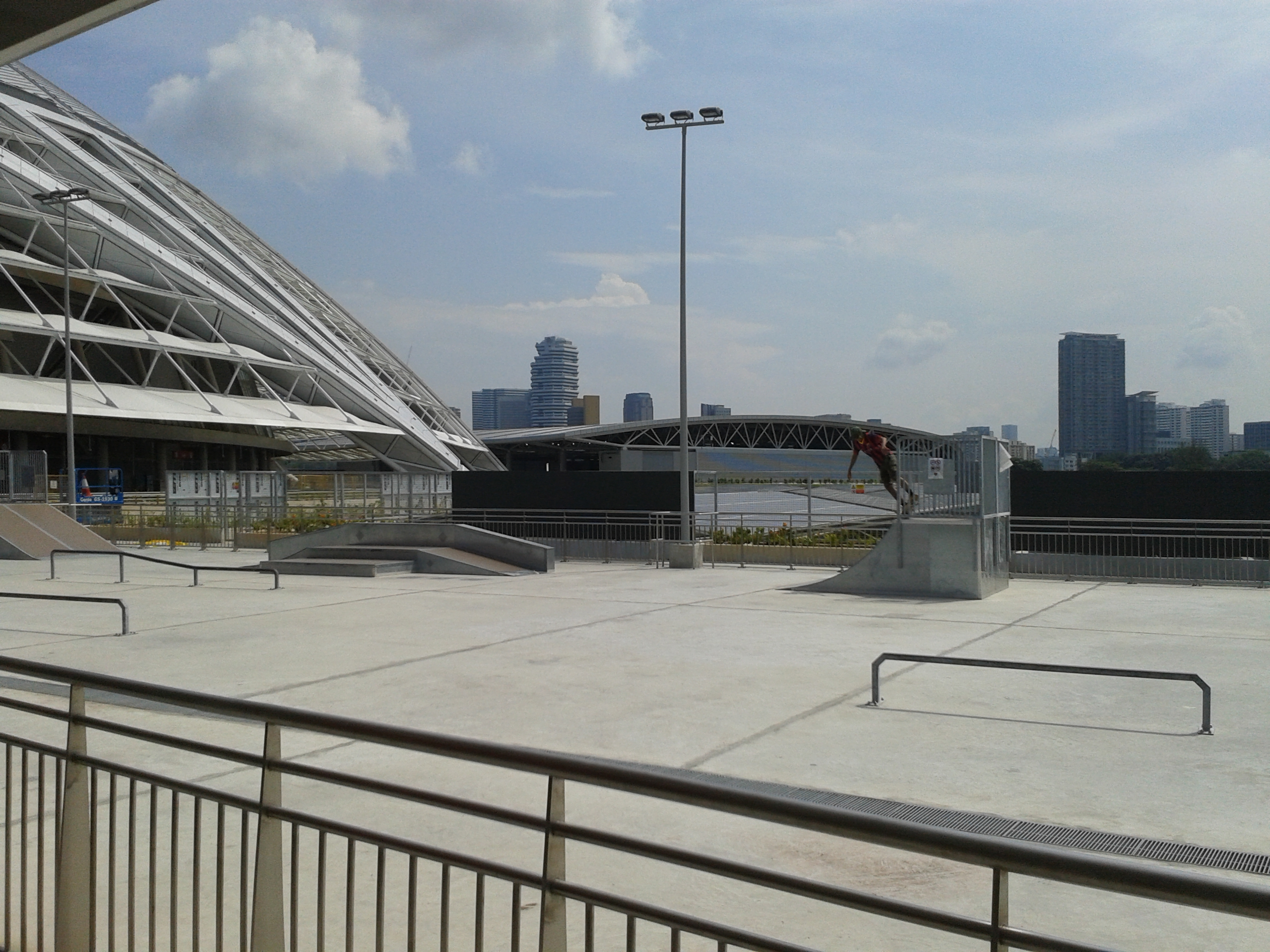
Skate Park

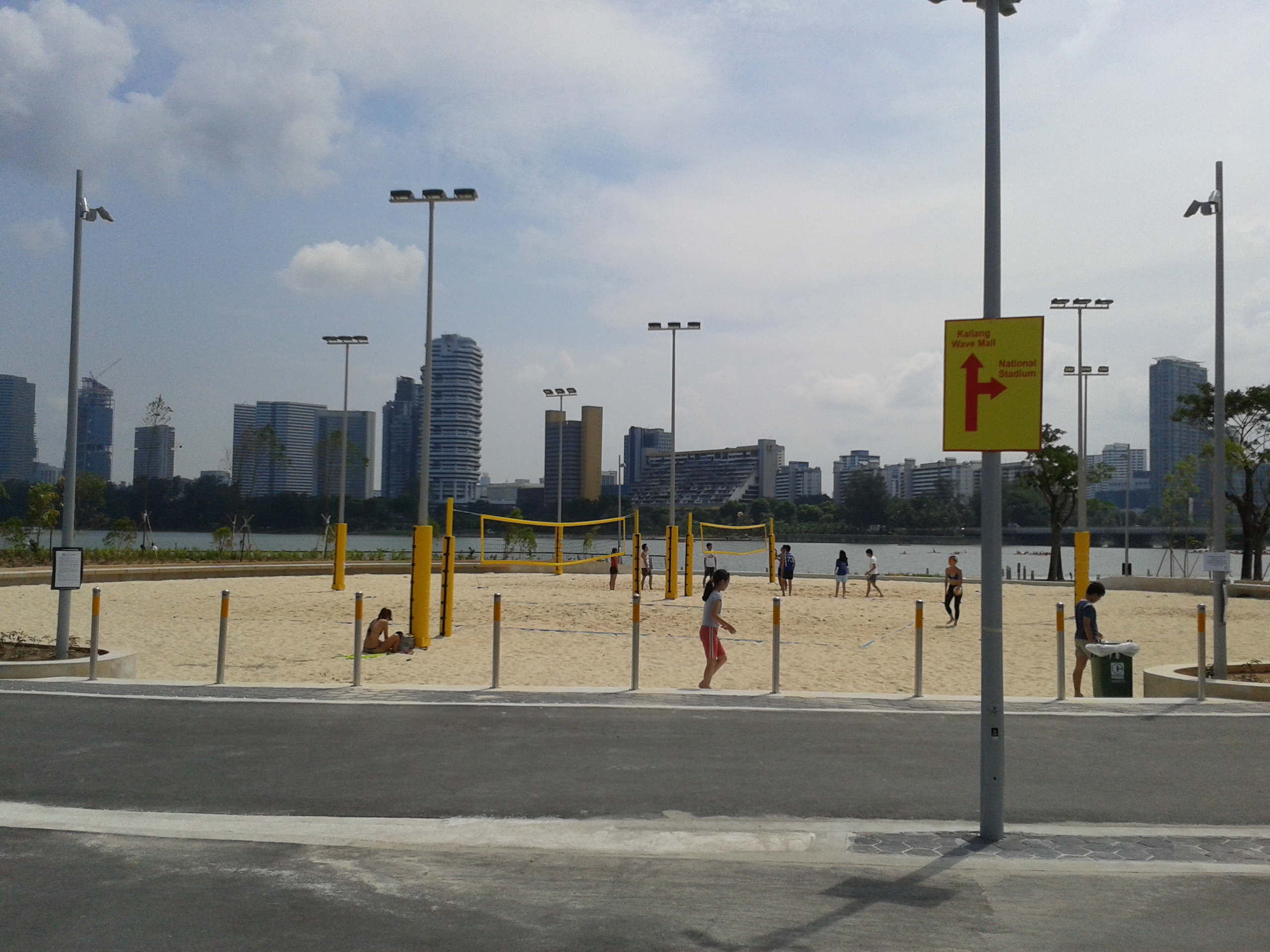
Beach Volleyball Area

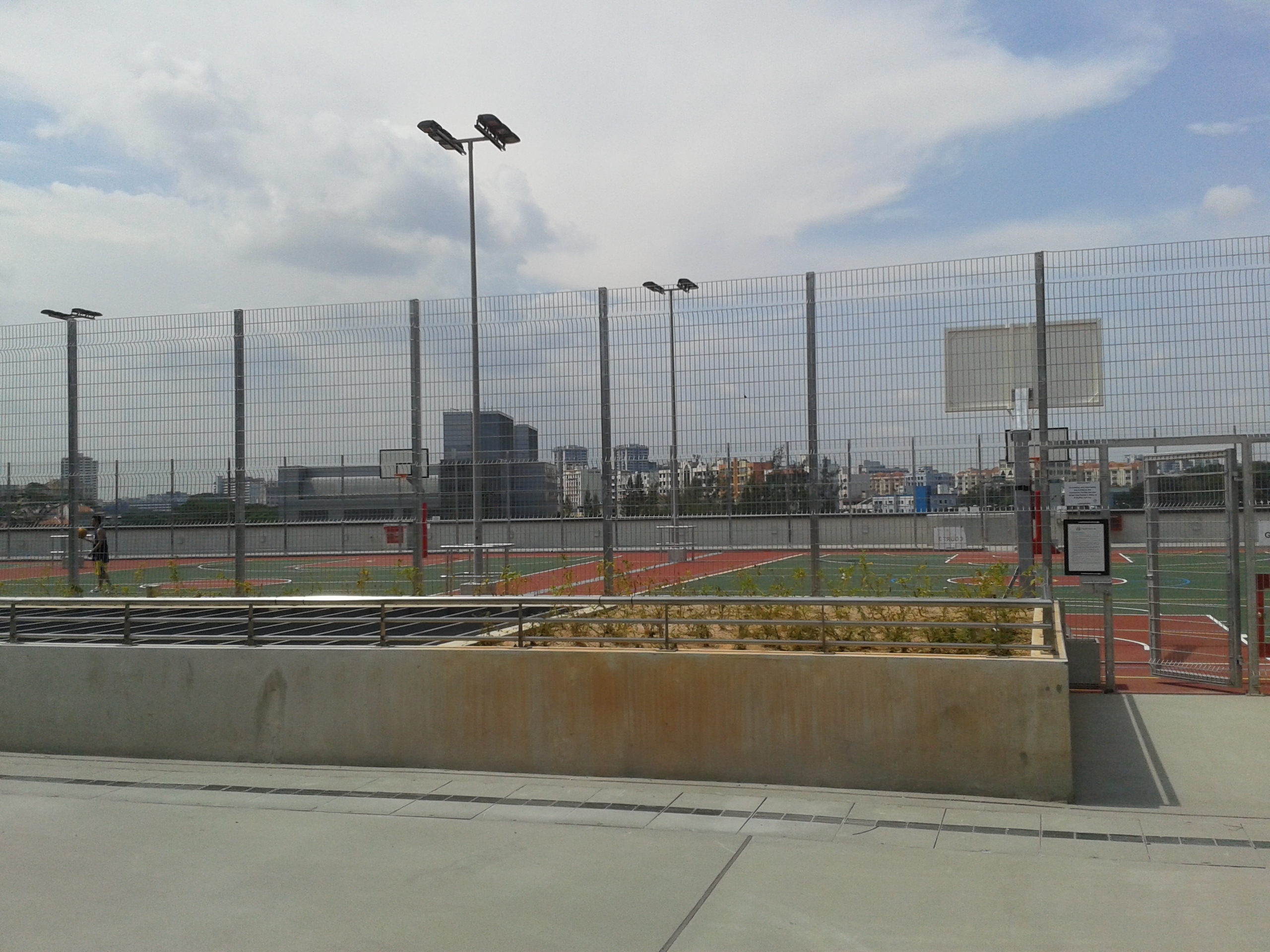
Outdoor Basketball Court
