= Leisure Park Kallang =

- Location: Kallang, Singapore
- Coordinates: 1.3022°N 103.8742°E
- Address: 5 Stadium Walk, Singapore 397693
- Opened: 1982; 44 years ago (original); November 2007; 19 years ago (refurbished)
- Owner: Jack Investments
- Num. of stores: 71
- Num. of anchor tenants: 4
- Floor area: 188,000 square feet (17,500 m^{2})
- Floors: 6
- Public transit: CC6 Stadium
- Website: www.leisurepark.com.sg

Leisure Park Kallang (or Kallang Leisure Park) is an entertainment centre and shopping mall in Kallang, Singapore. It is served by Stadium MRT station and is within the vicinity of the affluent community of Tanjong Rhu. It is sited next to the Singapore Sports Hub, Kallang Theatre and Singapore Indoor Stadium.

== History ==
In April 1978, Jack Chia-MPH Ltd (JC-MPH) acquired a 93.8 percent stake in Tung Yuan. As a result, Ice Palace was renamed Leisure-Drome (Leisure Drome). The complex was managed by a new subsidiary of JC-MPH, Leisure-Drome (Singapore) Pte Ltd. Go Skate (Singapore) Pte Ltd took over the lease of the ice skating rink and converted into a roller skating rink. Three bookstores were and a Thai fabrics and garment store were also opened.

In 1979, the second and third floor of Leisure Drome was converted into a 577 seats movie theatre to be operated by Cathay Organisation. The theatre started operating in November.

In 1982, the skating rink was converted into 30 new lanes for Kallang Bowl. The bowling centre was the world's top 10 largest centre with 92 lanes and the first fully computerised centre outside of the United States.

In 1984, JC-MPH announced an extension of Leisure Drome to be built to house the Cannons Sports Club Singapore, an affiliate of the Cannons Sports Club based in London which JC-MPH had acquired in 1983.

In November 1988, JC-MPH announced the sale of Leisure Drome to Hotel Tai-Pan Ltd, an associate of JC-MPH, for S$15,470,000. However, the sale proposal was lapsed in March 1989 and hence aborted.

In 1989, JC-MPH acquired the remaining 6.2 percent of Tung Yuan, making it the full owner of Leisure Drome. In June, JC-MPH, via Tung Yuang, sold Leisure Drome to Jack Investment Pte Ltd, an unrelated property developer despite similar names, for S$33,000,000.

In 1994, Leisure Drome was renamed Leisure Park Kallang.

The mall was reopened in 2007 and has previous tenants such as Filmgarde Cineplex, Kallang Ice World, food court Koufu, supermarket Cold Storage and bowling alley Kallang Bowl. In 2014, Level 4 of the mall was leased to voluntary welfare organisations.

== See also ==
- List of shopping malls in Singapore
