= Kallang Wave Mall =

- Location: Kallang, Singapore
- Coordinates: 1°18′11.5″N 103°52′22.5″E
- Address: 1 Stadium Place, Singapore 397628
- Opened: 27 June 2014; 12 years ago
- Manager: CapitaLand
- Num. of anchor tenants: 6
- Public transit: CC6 Stadium
- Website: www.sportshub.com.sg/directory

Kallang Wave Mall (Chinese: 嘉龙威购物广场) is a shopping mall which is part of the Singapore Sports Hub located at Kallang, Singapore.

== Etymology ==
The mall is named as a reference to the Kallang Wave, a wave cheer similar to the Mexican wave that was commonly seen in the former National Stadium that the Singapore Sports Hub replaces.

== History ==
Opened on 27 June 2014, Kallang Wave Mall is part of the Singapore Sports Hub and is integrated into the National Stadium.

Business at the Kallang Wave Mall was poor with original major tenants such as fashion retailer Forever 21 and electronics chain store Harvey Norman and NTUC Foodfare food court exiting the shopping mall by 2018. Cotton On exited Kallang Wave on 22 August 2025.

In 2021, Singapore-based company Esports Entertainment Asia opened an E-sports Experience Centre at Kallang Wave Mall. The Centre has an area of 2,000 square feet (190 m^{2}).

Situated at the doorstep of Kallang Wave Mall is Stadium MRT station along the Circle line.

Currently, Kallang Wave is undergoing a significant revamp which is expected to be completed by 2028. One of the mall's most prominent features, the indoor climbing wall, is set to be upgraded into a structure standing 21 meter tall, which will rank among the tallest indoor climbing walls in South East Asia.
