= Stadium MRT station =

Mass Rapid Transit station in Singapore

Stadium CC6 体育场 ஸ்டேடியம்
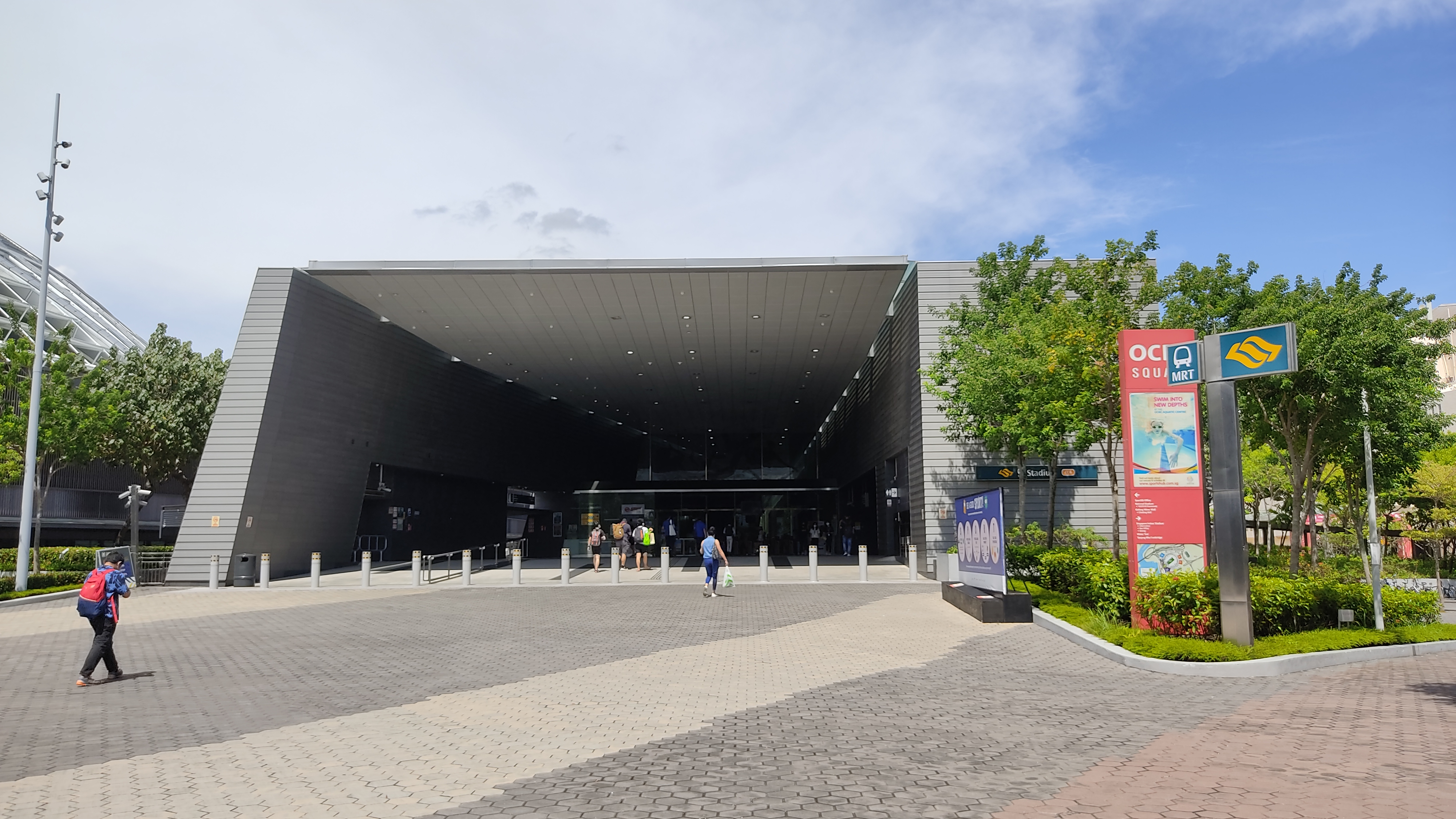
- Exit A of the station

General information
- Location: 3 Stadium Walk, Singapore 397692
- Coordinates: 01°18′10″N 103°52′31″E
- System: Mass Rapid Transit (MRT) station
- Owner: Land Transport Authority
- Operator: SMRT Trains
- Line: Circle Line
- Platforms: 2 (1 island platform)
- Tracks: 2
- Connections: TE23 Tanjong Rhu; EW10 Kallang

Construction
- Structure type: Underground
- Platform levels: 1
- Parking: Yes (Kallang Wave Mall, National Stadium)
- Cycle facilities: Yes
- Accessible: Yes

Other information
- Station code: SDM

History
- Opened: 17 April 2010; 16 years ago
- Former names: Boulevard, Tanjong Rhu

Passengers
- June 2024: 10,310 per day

Services
Preceding station	Mass Rapid Transit	Following station
Nicoll Highway Clockwise	Circle Line	Mountbatten Anticlockwise
Nicoll Highway towards Dhoby Ghaut	Circle Line	Mountbatten towards Prince Edward Road
Track layout
Location
- Location within Singapore Rail central area

Stadium MRT station is an underground Mass Rapid Transit (MRT) station on the Circle Line (CCL). Located in the area of Kallang, Central Region, Singapore, the station serves The Kallang (formerly the Singapore Sports Hub) and its facilities including the National Stadium, Indoor Stadium, Kallang Theatre and Leisure Park Kallang. It is operated by SMRT Trains.

Announced to be part of the Marina MRT line branch to either Kallang or Paya Lebar, construction of the station started in 2001. The line was later incorporated in the CCL as Stage 1 and the station opened on 17 April 2010 when Stages 1 and 2 of the CCL commenced operations. The design of the station by WOHA was commissioned through the Marina line Architectural Design Competition and was awarded the "Design Of The Year" of the President's Design Award in 2010.

== History ==
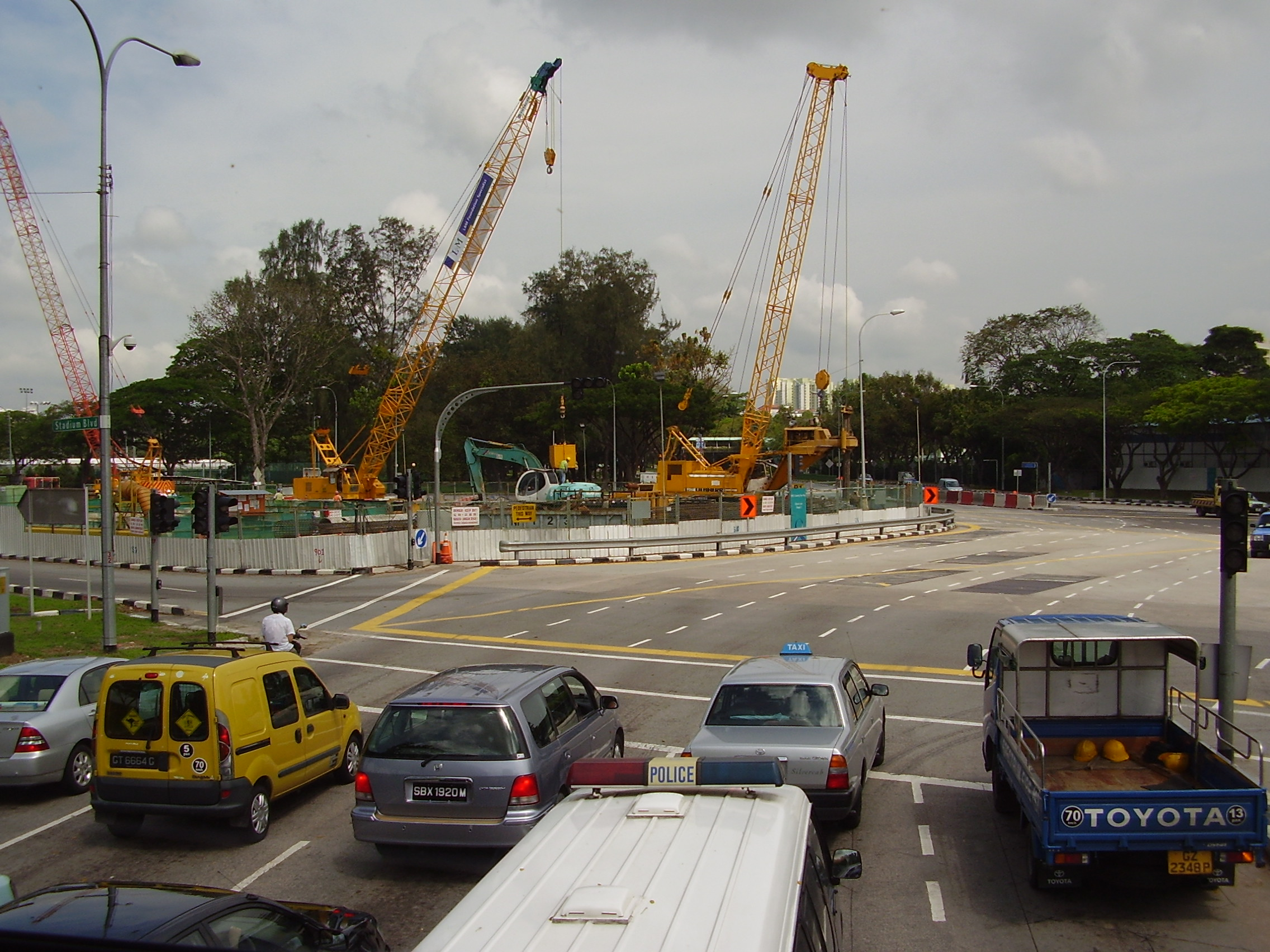
Construction works for the station in 2006

Before the station was constructed, the closest MRT stations to the National Stadium were Kallang and Lavender stations, which were a considerable distance away from the stadium. Additionally, road access to the National Stadium was hampered by traffic jams during major events at the venue. When the stations for the Marina Line (MRL) were revealed, the line was announced to serve the National Stadium as the line goes along Stadium Boulevard.

The station then became part of Circle line (CCL) Stage 1 when the MRL was incorporated into the CCL in 2001. Contract 824 (Note: Later succeeded by Contract 828 in the aftermath of the Nicoll Highway Collapse) for the construction of Boulevard station and associated tunnels was awarded to a joint venture between Nishimatsu Construction Co Ltd and Lum Chang Building Contractors Pte Ltd at S$270 million (US$150.69 million). (Note: The contract includes the construction of the adjacent Nicoll Highway station)

On 6 February 2002, traffic around the former National Stadium had to be realigned for the construction of the station. To facilitate the construction of the station, Stadium Boulevard was closed from Stadium Drive to Stadium Walk. Along with the other stations on Stages 1 and 2, (Note: From the Dhoby Ghaut to Tai Seng stations) the station started operations on 17 April 2010.

== Station details ==
=== Services and location ===
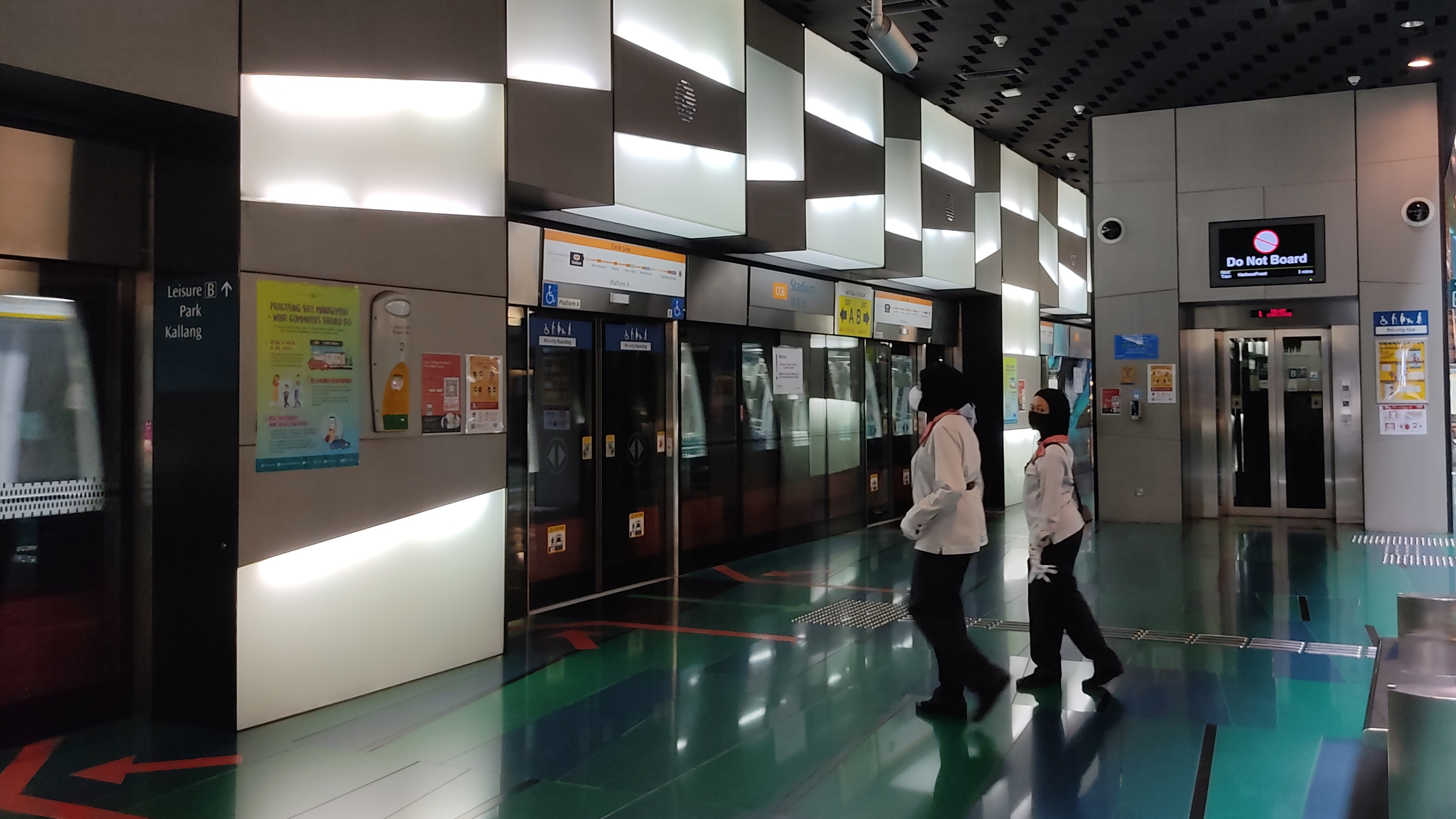
A train from Marina Bay station terminating at the station

The station is served by the Circle line (CCL) between the Nicoll Highway and Mountbatten stations. The station code is CC6 as reflected on official maps. During off-peak hours, the station is the terminus for CCL train services from Dhoby Ghaut station. The station operates from about 5:45 am to 12:15 am depending on the first and last train timings at this station. Train frequencies on the line generally range from 5 to 7 minutes.

As the name suggests, the station serves the Singapore Sports Hub and surrounding facilities, such as the Water Sports Centre, Singapore Indoor Stadium, Kallang Theatre, OCBC Aquatic Centre, OCBC Arena, Kallang Wave Mall and Leisure Park Kallang. The station is located south of the Sports Hub and at the western end of the Stadium Boulevard.

=== Architecture ===
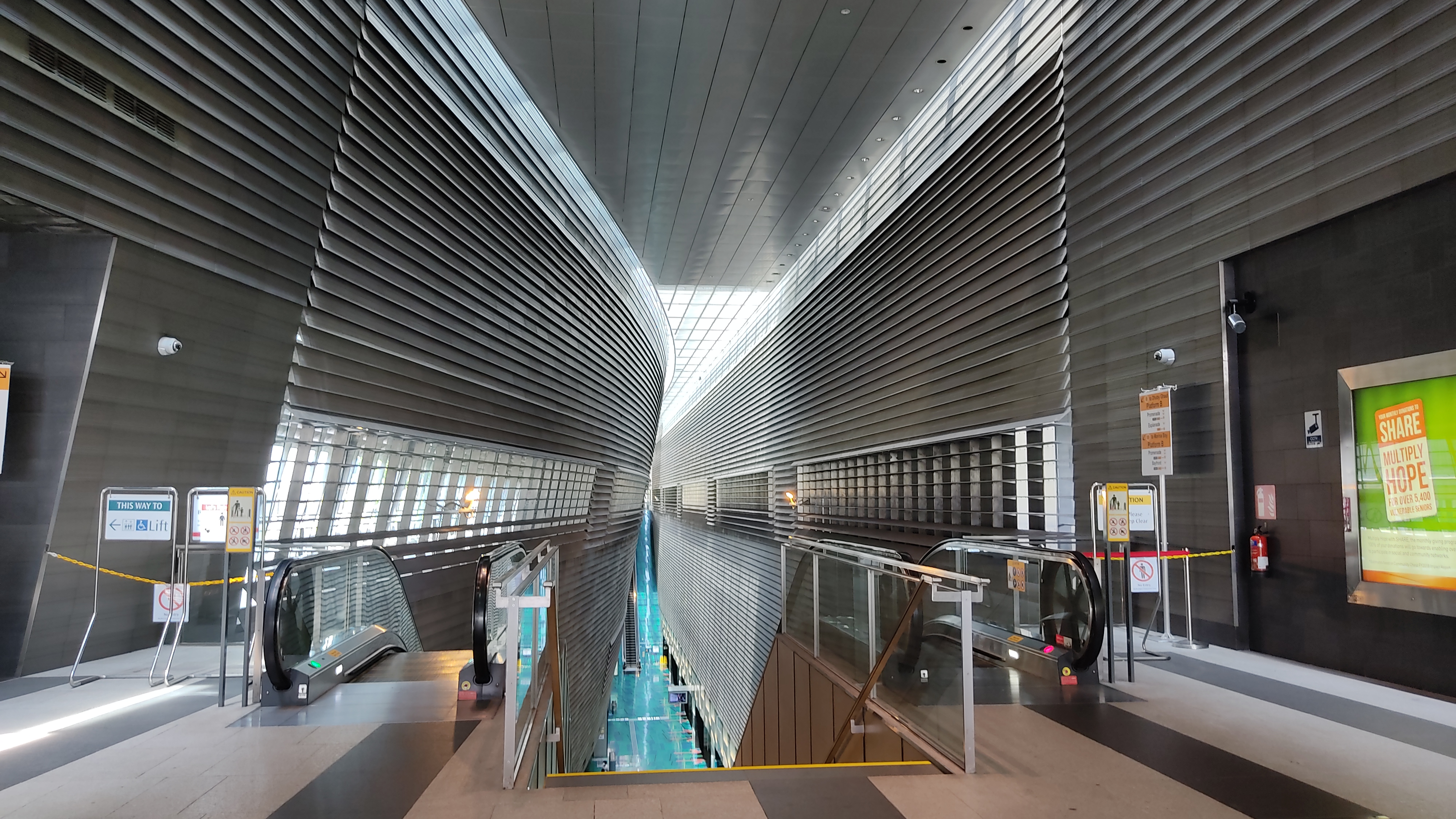
The curved side contrasting against the straight side of the station

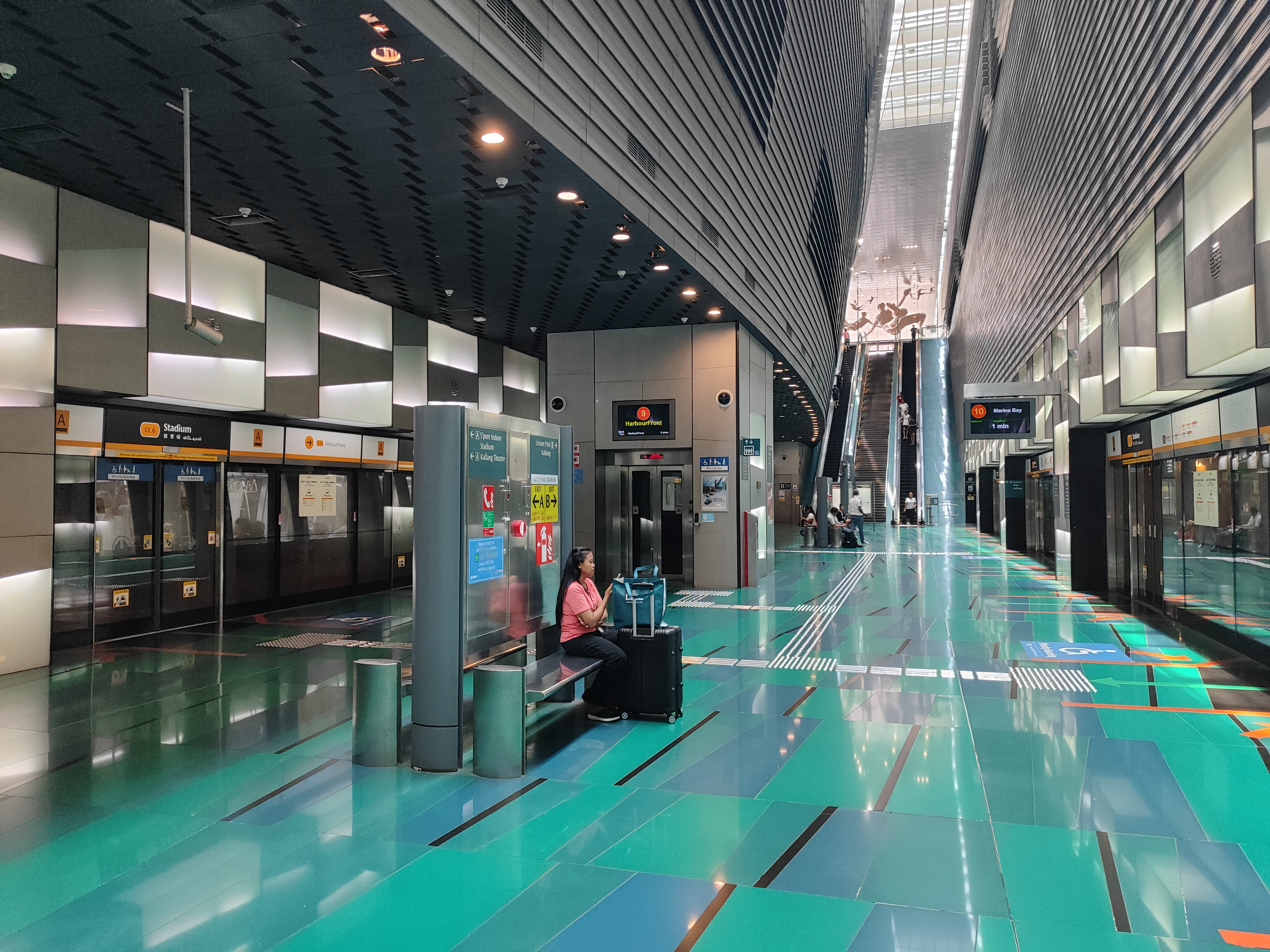
Platform level of the station

Stadium station was designed by an architectural team from WOHA, led by Wong Mun Summ and Richard Hassell. The station was one of two stations (Note: The other is Bras Basah station) to be commissioned through the Marina Line Architectural Design Competition jointly organized by the Land Transport Authority (LTA) and the Singapore Institute of Architects (SIA) in 2000. The station was designed to handle large passenger numbers during major events, featuring an open-air concourse and plaza space to accommodate the crowds and prevent overcrowding within the station. The open-ended station allows it to be linked to future developments around the station at ground level.

Initially, it was proposed by the design team to elevate the then-existing Stadium Boulevard and build a public space underneath which would link to the surrounding buildings. However, after analysing possible traffic patterns for the road bridge, the LTA recommended scrapping the bridge. As the bridge was a key feature of the design, the team had to redesign the station, but they kept the characteristics of a public plaza, a transparent diagram and basic yet massive elements for the new design.

The new design contrasts a straight side against a curved opposite side. According to WOHA, the change is just rotating the old design on its side, with the bridge changed to the curved side and the ground being the straight vertical side. The curve side and the grey colour scheme draws reference to the old National Stadium, which has been demolished to make way for the current Singapore Sports Hub. The station has a grand spacious interior inspired by European train stations built in the 19th century, with the skylight naturally illuminating the platforms to make them visually appealing and eliminating the need to have excessive signage to navigate around. The station exterior was cladded with ribbed aluminium to make the material ambiguous; making them look soft or hard depending on light conditions and time of the day.

This station was awarded "Design Of The Year" of the President's Design Award in 2010, nominated by Patrick Bingham-Hall, an architectural photographer. Bingham-Hall had praised the station as a 'brilliantly intuitive piece of architecture (which) defies imitation', while the jurors of the award commented that the station design was 'appropriate' to reflect the importance of the new Sports Hub the station serves. The station also received the 9th SIA Architectural Design Awards for the Industrial, Transport & Infrastructure, the Award for International Architecture by the Australian Institute of Architects and the 2010 International Architecture Award by the Chicago Athenaeum and the European Centre for Architecture Art Design and Urban Studies. It was also one of the finalists for the 2008 World Architecture Festival.

=== Artwork ===
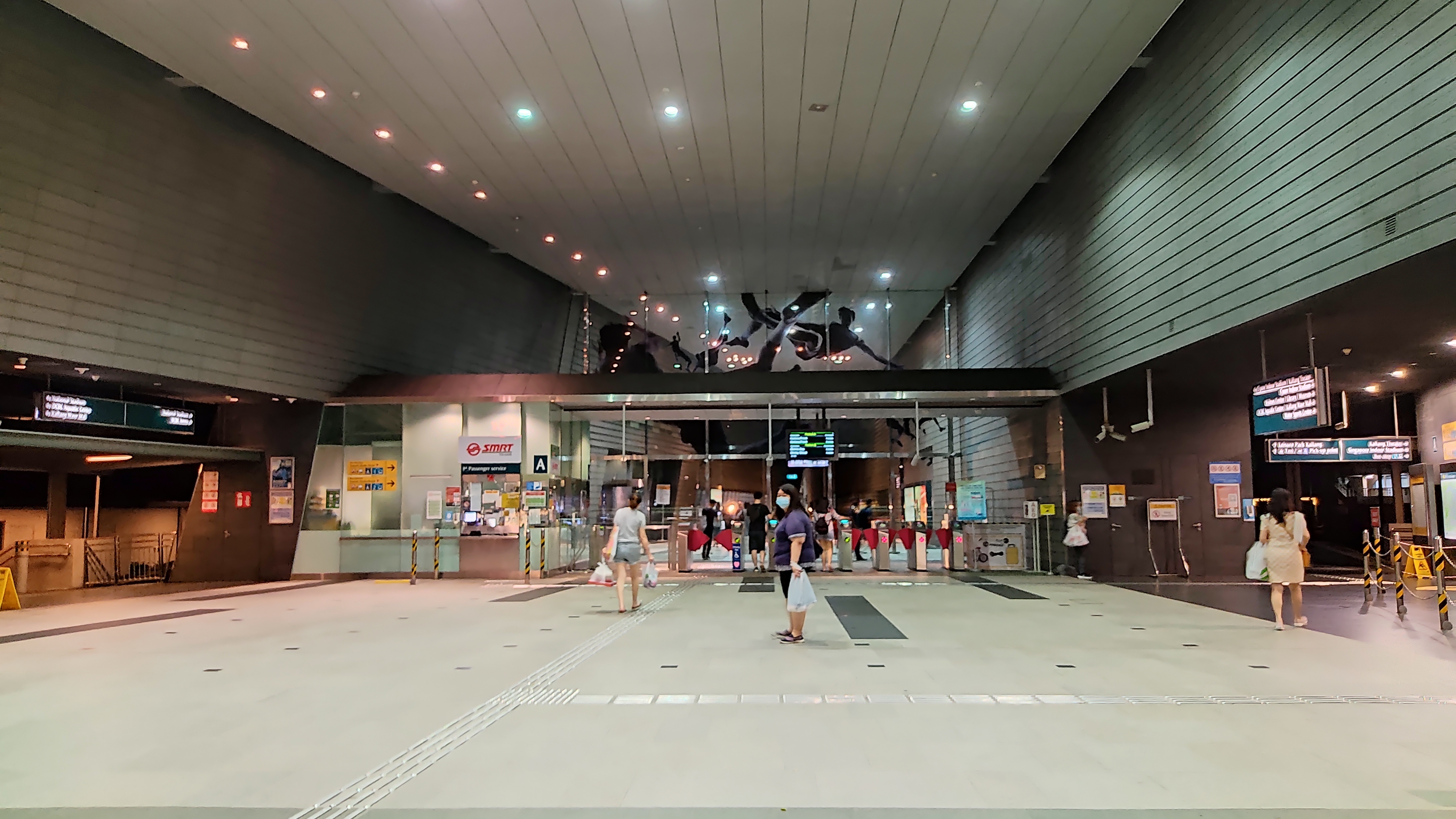
The artwork behind the faregates at the concourse level of the station.

External image
- The full image of The Perfect Moment by Roy Zhang Source: royzhang.com

As part of the MRT network Art-in-Transit programme, (Note: Public art showcase which integrates artworks into the MRT network) The Perfect Moment by Roy Zhang is displayed above the two entrances of the station. The artwork depicts a series of silhouettes of a sportsman 'gracefully dancing in the air' in a surreal dreamscape, presenting the beauty, energy and simplicity of the human body during sport activities. The artwork is in two sets, each set featuring eight images of the sportsperson each. At the entrance to the Indoor Stadium, the set of silhouettes seem to show the sportsman making a 'dramatic dive' like a goalkeeper, while at the other entrance to the Kallang Leisure Park, another set depicts him 'frozen in the middle of an elegant kick'. The sporting movements, when viewed as a whole, made the whole set appear to be a 'choreographed dance recital'.

The artwork's monochrome images of the athlete in action integrate well with the predominately black scheme and the dramatic design of the station. The integration was a conscious decision by the photographer, who does not wish for his work to be 'jarring or irrelevant' to the context. Taking inspiration from the old stadium, the new Sports Hub and the performances of the Indoor Stadium, Zhang decided to use images of sports and choreograph it as an art performance. The Perfect Moment makes reference to a painting Dance by Henri Matisse which similarly depicts a group of human figures in abstract form. The artwork was planned to be rather colourful like the painting but toned down the colour of his images upon learning WOHA's design intentions. Zhang decided on shooting only a single sportsperson instead of multiple sportspeople.

It was suggested by the Art-in-Transit Review Panel to use a famous sportsperson and add sporting objects to better convey the sports theme of the artwork. However, Zhang felt that doing such will make the work 'more like a billboard advertisement', and has no wish to use a famous local athlete for he wanted commuters 'to aspire what they want to achieve' rather than 'follow the footsteps of someone', preferring to use a figure 'who can represent anybody'. Zhang managed to find a Brazilian model, whom he regarded as 'a perfect combination of sports and art', due to his passion of football and training in capoeira. (Note: A Brazilian martial art that combines elements of sports and dance) During the one-day shoot, both collaborated and tried on various poses, with the model performing his moves over a trampoline. After the shoot, Zhang then carefully picked out the 108 photographs he would use for the artwork.

The artwork was originally set to be placed along the glass wall at the concourse level. However, the curator Karen Lim was concerned about the visibility of the artwork at the assigned location, stating that it will fade due to prolonged exposure to the afternoon sunlight. Managing to convince LTA to move the artwork to the 5.2 metres (17 ft) by 10.8 metres (35 ft) glass panels above the two entrances, Zhang had to cut down his photo selection to just 16, but it allowed the artwork to be more visible with the enlarged figures.

Additionally, there is a mural as part of SMRT's Comic Connect. (Note: A public art showcase of heritage-themed murals by the train operator) Created by Cheng Zhi Xin, Chyenne Tan, Kiara Consigliere Goh Sze Min, Violette Evangelynne Lovell Lie, and students from the School of the Arts (SOTA), the mural "[captures] the energy and excitement [of Singapore's] sports scene...along with Singapore's past and budding athletes".

== Notes and references ==
=== Bibliography ===
- Zhuang, Justin (2013). Art in transit: Circle line MRT. Singapore: Land Transport Authority. ISBN 978-981-07-4982-8. OCLC 854958677.
