= Kallang Theatre =

Theatre in Kallang, Singapore

Kallang Theatre is a 1,744-seat theatre in Kallang, Singapore. Located at 1A Stadium Walk, Singapore 397689 within the Singapore Sports Hub, beside Leisure Park Kallang and Stadium MRT station, Kallang Theatre is managed by Sport Singapore.

== History ==
Kallang Theatre was opened on 7 April 1978. Owned by Chong Gay Theatres, the theatre was a cinema with 2,400 seats but opened with 2,000 seats with 400 seats to be built later. It was the largest cinema of Southeast Asia at that time. The theatre was five storeys high and cost S$7 million to build.

In 1981, the theatre was bought over by the Government of Singapore for S$12.5 million due to the need of a medium size theatre in Singapore. As the acoustics of the National Theatre was deemed to be poor and the venue was subjected to the weather, it was faster to convert the Kallang Theatre for immediate use. The theatre, once converted, was to be managed by the National Theatre Trust. The renovation was expected to cost the government S$9 million.

In March 1986, the National Theatre Trust moved to Kallang Theatre despite renovation of the theatre was not completed. Later in June, the renovation of the theatre was completed.

Aside from hosting cultural events, Kallang Theatre also became the venue of the annual National Day Rally. From 1986 to 2000, Prime Ministers Lee Kuan Yew and Goh Chok Tong held their rallies at Kallang Theatre.

The theatre was closed in 2007.

In January 2011, the theatre was opened for tender by the Singapore Land Authority. In June, it was announced that it would be reopened in August.

== See also ==
- Kallang
