= Dakota Crescent =

1958 housing development in Singapore

Coordinates: 1.3065°N 103.8837°E

Dakota Crescent is one of Singapore’s oldest housing estates built by Singapore Improvement Trust (SIT), the government development authority, in 1958.

Only 15 original blocks, all of which are even numbered, remain. These low-rise flats are located at Old Airport Road. Many of the residents who formerly resided in the old estate of Dakota Crescent were once victims, or relatives or descendants of such persons, of several fire calamities which destroyed the numerous kampongs (villages) all across Singapore at that time, such as mainly from the so-called "Friday The 13th Fire" at Kampong Tiong Bahru on 13 February 1959 and the big fire at Kampong Koo Chye on 5 April 1958 (present-day Lorong 3 Geylang) in Kallang.

The estate used to be part of a larger SIT estate called Kallang Airport Estate. The even numbered side used to stretch to the other end of Dakota Crescent, while even more odd numbered blocks were located on the other side of Old Airport Road. All but two of the odd numbered blocks and HDB blocks 93-99, have since been demolished. On the even numbered side, blocks 2-6 and 10-32 still exist while blocks 8 and 34-72 were demolished. Blocks 8 and 58-66 were the first to be demolished, demolished between 30 and 40 years ago. Blocks 68, 70 and 72 were HDB blocks completed later and were selected for the Selective En Bloc Redevelopment Scheme in 1999 and demolished in 2005. Residents of these affected blocks moved to the HDB-built replacement flats, which were located at the nearby Pine Green (these comprise Blocks 39, 43, 45, 47 and 49 at Jalan Tiga) in 2004. In 2014, Dakota Crescent was earmarked for further future redevelopment under Mountbatten's estate-renewal plans and all remaining residents relocated and moved out by the end of 2016.

The area of what is now Dakota Crescent was the easternmost boundary of the former Kallang Airport. The name "Dakota Crescent" was derived from the Douglas DC-3 "Dakota" aircraft that used to land frequently at the Kallang Airport when it was still operational. Other locations that bear the name "Dakota" include the roads Dakota Crescent and Dakota Close, as well as the Mass Rapid Transit (MRT) station Dakota.

== History ==
In the 1840s, there were many kampongs situated on the river bank of Geylang River which runs near Dakota Crescent.

After the Second World War, Singapore experienced a significant influx of immigrants, many of whom settled in urban kampongs at the edge of the Central Area. Consisting of wooden houses built over empty plots, swamps and old cemeteries, these kampongs expanded rapidly through the 1950s, housing a quarter of Singapore's urban population by the early 1960s. As the central area of Singapore became gradually congested, the British colonial government decided to come up with new public-housing estates to tackle this growing problem. One of the plans included developing the Kallang area (just to the east of the town-centre) into Singapore's equivalent of London's Hyde Park. This master-plan was reported in the local newspaper, The Straits Times, dated from 11 March 1955.

The low-rise brick-clad flats of Dakota Crescent Estate were built by SIT in 1958. The 17 blocks of flats were completed in 1959. In 1960, after Housing and Development Board (HDB) replaced SIT in state housing development of Singapore, the estate was handed over to HDB.

When Kallang Airport was closed in 1955, being replaced by Paya Lebar Airport (or Singapore International Airport), the old runway which ran parallel to the adjacent Mountbatten Road became Old Airport Road, while the surrounding public-housing developments became known as Old Airport Estate or Kallang Airport Estate. The Old Airport Estate had a total of 2,936 housing-units which are equipped with modern amenities such as piped running water, cooking-gas, flush-toilets and electricity. Dakota Crescent was also the first public-housing estate to feature one-room flats.

Dakota Crescent was named after the Douglas DC-3, which was referred to by the British as the Dakota (particularly for the military variant of the same plane, the C-47 Skytrain), which was commonly spotted landing and taking off at the nearby Kallang Airport. The christening of the estate's name also supposedly commemorates an aviation disaster at the airport which happened on 29 June 1946, in which a Royal Air Force Dakota aircraft crashed leading to the death of everybody on board.

In 2014, it was announced that the 17 blocks will be demolished as part of Mountbatten's estate renewal plans. The blocks had to be vacated by the end of 2016 and the site reserved for future residential development. In 2016, Lim Biow Chuan, Member of Parliament of Mountbatten Single Member Constituency, which includes Dakota Crescent, spoke in Parliament during an adjournment motion asking the government to reconsider development plans for Dakota Crescent and to convert the estate to be used for other purposes.

In December 2017, Minister for National Development Lawrence Wong announced that Dakota Crescent's central cluster of six blocks (10, 12, 14, 16, 18 & 20) and the Dove Playground will be conserved while the rest will be redeveloped.

== Architecture ==
=== Open Spaces and Red-Bricked Flats ===
The design of these SIT-built flats was largely modelled after similar towns back in the UK and done by architects who worked for the British colonial government. The early public-housing estates in Singapore adapted various architectural elements of British architectural styles which were required to be suited to the tropical climate of the country. This can be seen from the existence of many wide open spaces, like that of London's Hyde Park earlier mentioned and the red-bricked flats at Dakota Crescent in the past.

The open spaces of Dakota Crescent's estate, much of which still exist today, are pedestrian-friendly and have many uses, one of which is for children to play around in a large area at ease. Open public spaces such as these are no longer commonly found in modern housing estates of Singapore nowadays, since these newer flats are built in a more compact manner in order to save land-space. On the other hand, back in the old days, red clay-bricks were regarded as being very suitable building materials for housing and buildings in Singapore as it is a material that has the following three important properties: good fire-protection, high wind-protection and superior moisture-control. Furthermore, these red-bricked flats served as an icon of Dakota Crescent. People are instantly reminded of the Old Kallang Estate or Dakota Crescent upon hearing phrases such as “Red-bricked Houses”. Unfortunately, the flats at Dakota Crescent were eventually repainted in order to prevent erosion from the rain, termite infestation and other damaging natural elements. The flats were painted at least twice after 2002. Some of the old paint on these flats have already been seen peeling off and thus revealed the original red bricks beneath.

=== Building Typologies ===
Dakota Crescent now consists of 15 blocks of low-rise flats, with the highest blocks being 7 storey high. The remaining even numbered blocks have 4 types of building typologies, which are as follows:

- 7-storey butterfly-shaped (pi-shaped) blocks (Blocks 2, 4, 6, 14, 18, 22, 28 and 30)

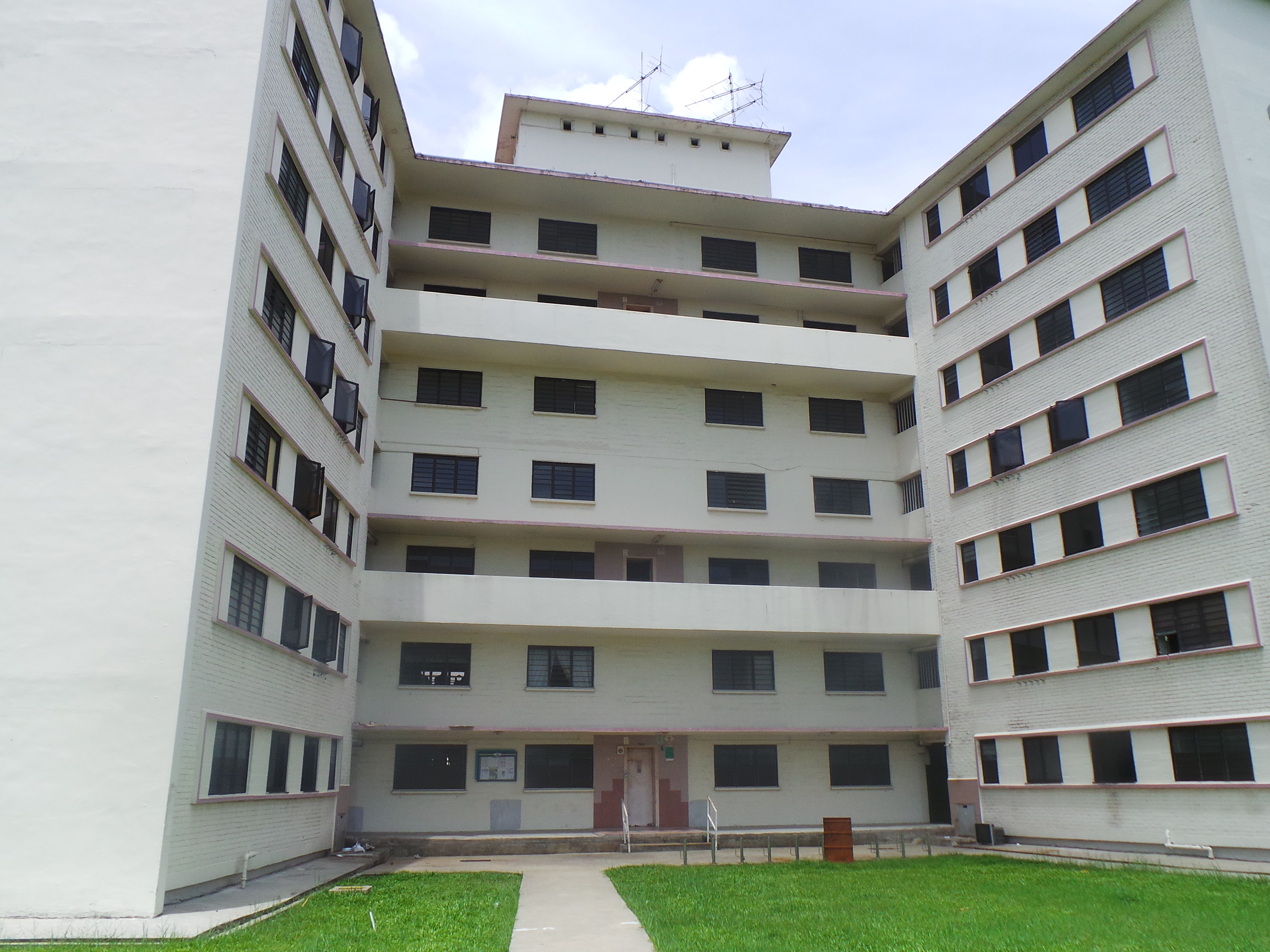
Butterfly-shaped block (Block 18, Dakota Crescent)

These flats are shaped in this way, instead of the usual long blocks, so as to easily fit as many blocks as possible in Dakota Crescent. In order to keep the number of units are the same even when making the blocks compact, the center is being pushed out to create the wings. The curvature of the road might also be the reason to why these blocks are curved.

- 3-storey walk-up apartments (Blocks 16, 24, 26 and 32)

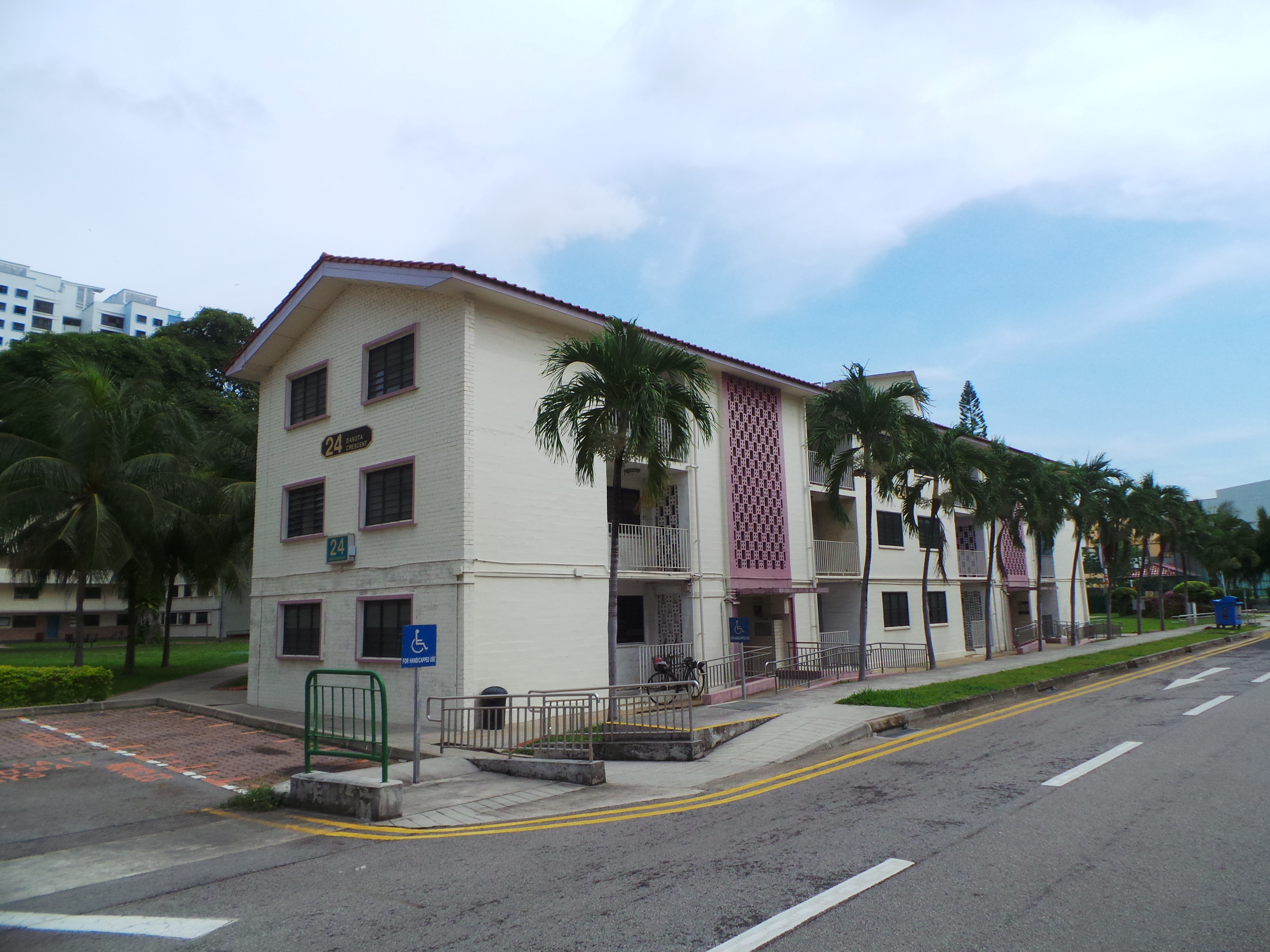
3-storey walk-up apartment (Block 24, Dakota Crescent)

- 2-storey commercial blocks/shop house (Block 12)

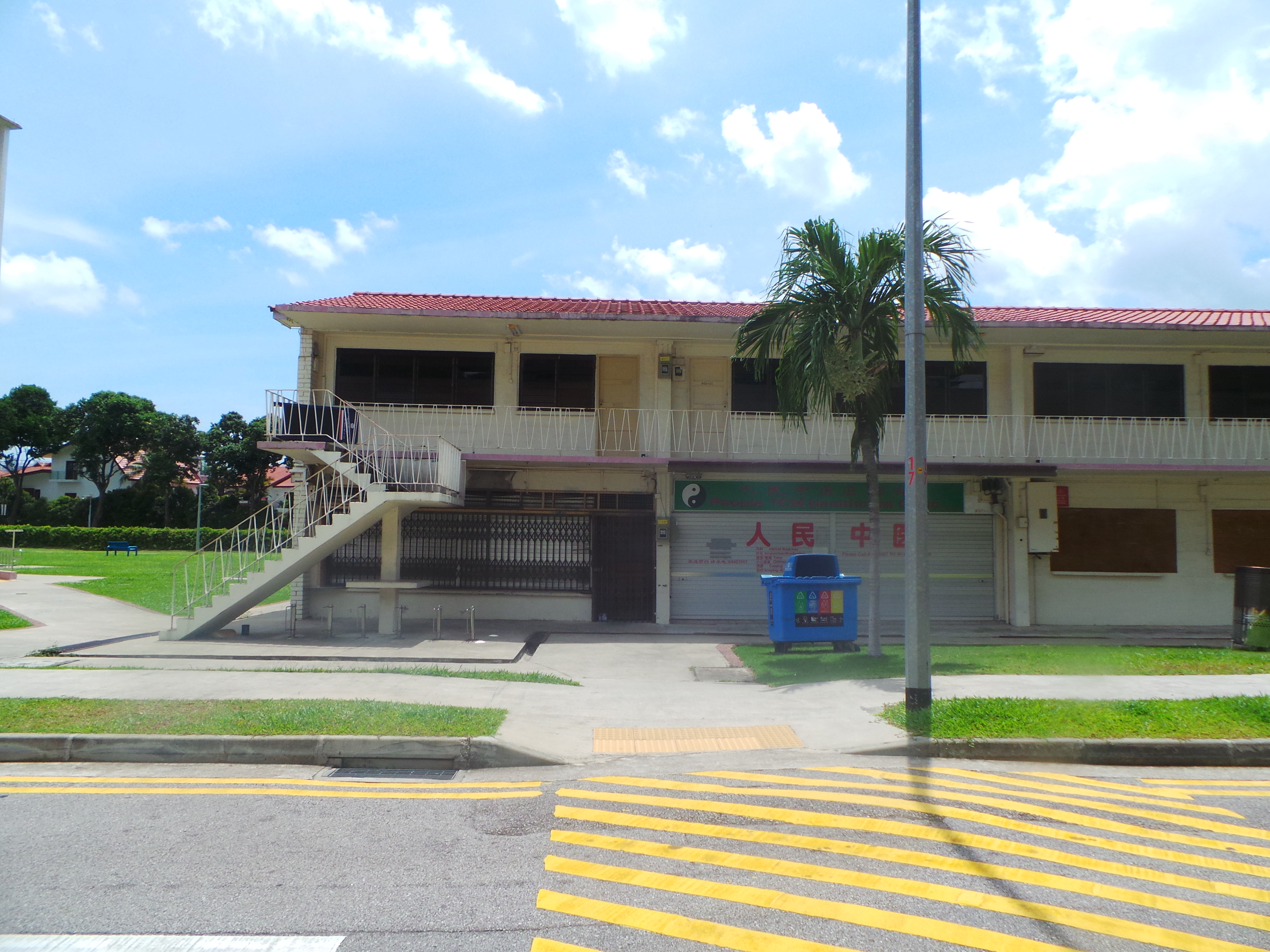
2-storey commercial block (Block 12, Dakota Crescent)

The first storey was commercialized and used as shop houses e.g. Tian Kee & Co. Provision Shop, while the second storey was residential.

- 7-storey slab (straight) blocks (Blocks 10 and 20)

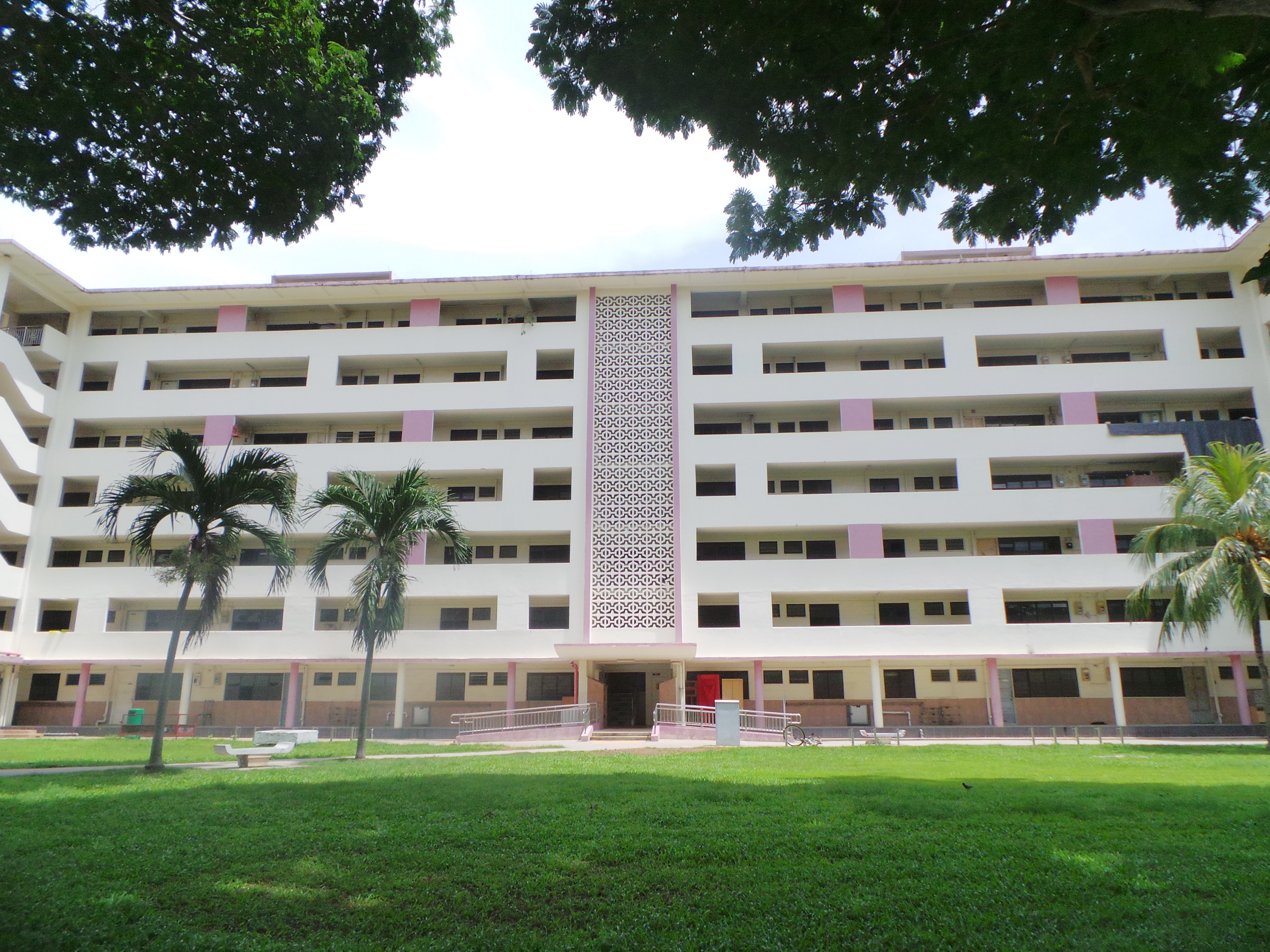
7-storey straight block (Block 10, Dakota Crescent)

There were originally many more typologies, like straight pi-shaped blocks and 3 storey 1-room blocks, but all blocks with such typologies were demolished many years ago.

The butterfly-shaped blocks, walk-up apartments and commercial shop houses are unique to Dakota Crescent and cannot be found elsewhere, unlike the straight blocks which are replicated and can be found in other SIT estates. However, the estates which had the straight blocks have since been demolished and the two blocks in Dakota are the last surviving ones.

=== Neon Light Advertisement ===
In the 1960s, the use of neon lights for advertisement billboards was first introduced in Singapore. Even though this form of advertising only takes up less than a percent of the total advertising expenditure in Singapore, there were still a number of public supporters and companies which wanted to use neon advertisements. These advertisements are placed on the walls of prominent buildings, with those along the roads being easier to spot and hence more attractive. Places such as South Bridge Road and Guillemard Circus had these neon advertisements. Similarly, Block 6 of Dakota Crescent used to have one neon light advertisement but it was eventually removed.

=== Balconies ===
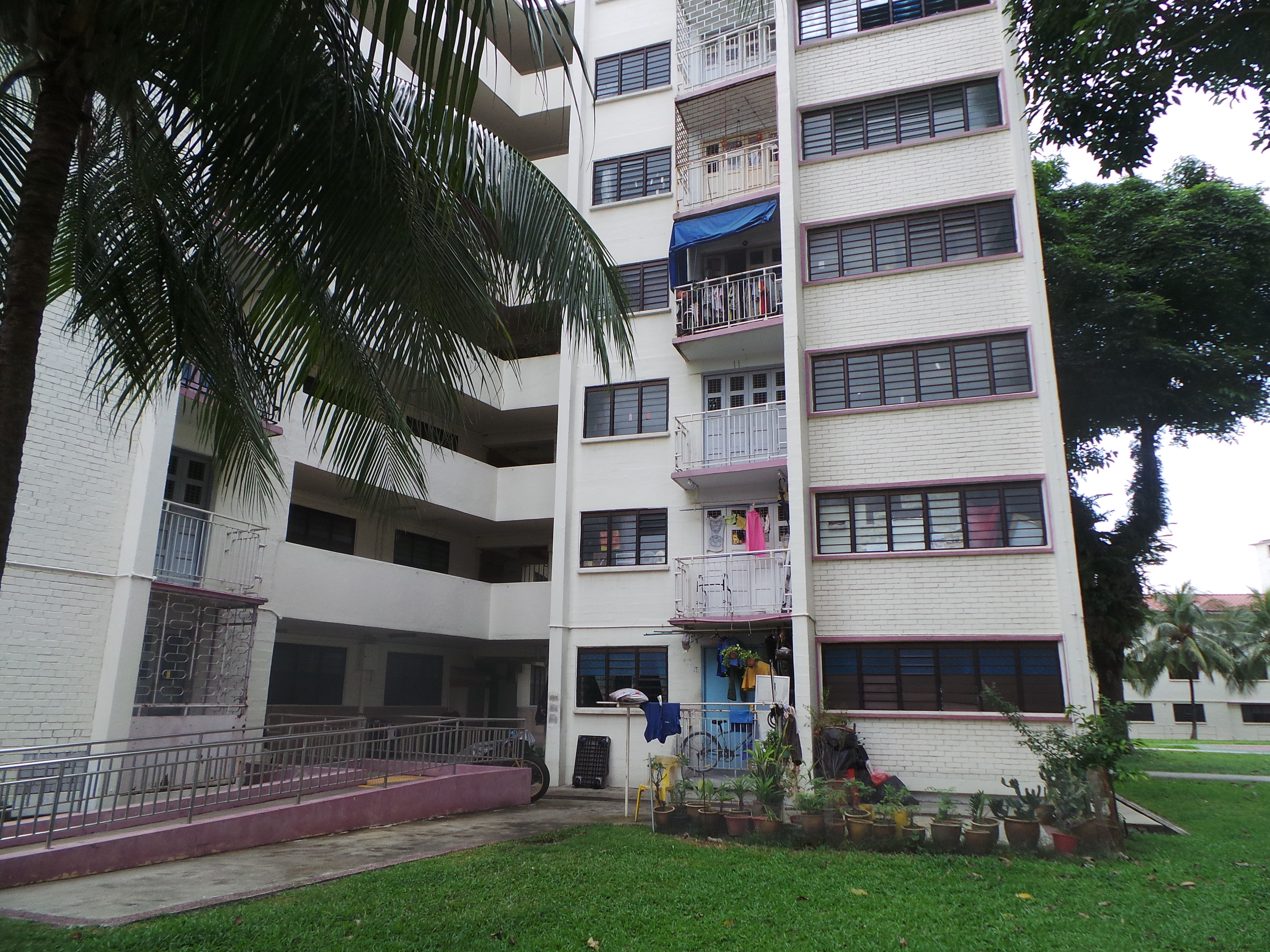
Dakota Balconies

The balconies at Dakota Crescent are very unusual and different from the modern HDB flats’ balconies – one can easily see many of the balconies at Dakota Crescent having metal grills and brightly painted louvered doors, which are breathable. It is said that the balconies were painted visually different by the residents themselves, who were afraid of getting lost, so that they can recognize their houses at a glance.

=== Vintage Schindler Traction Elevator ===
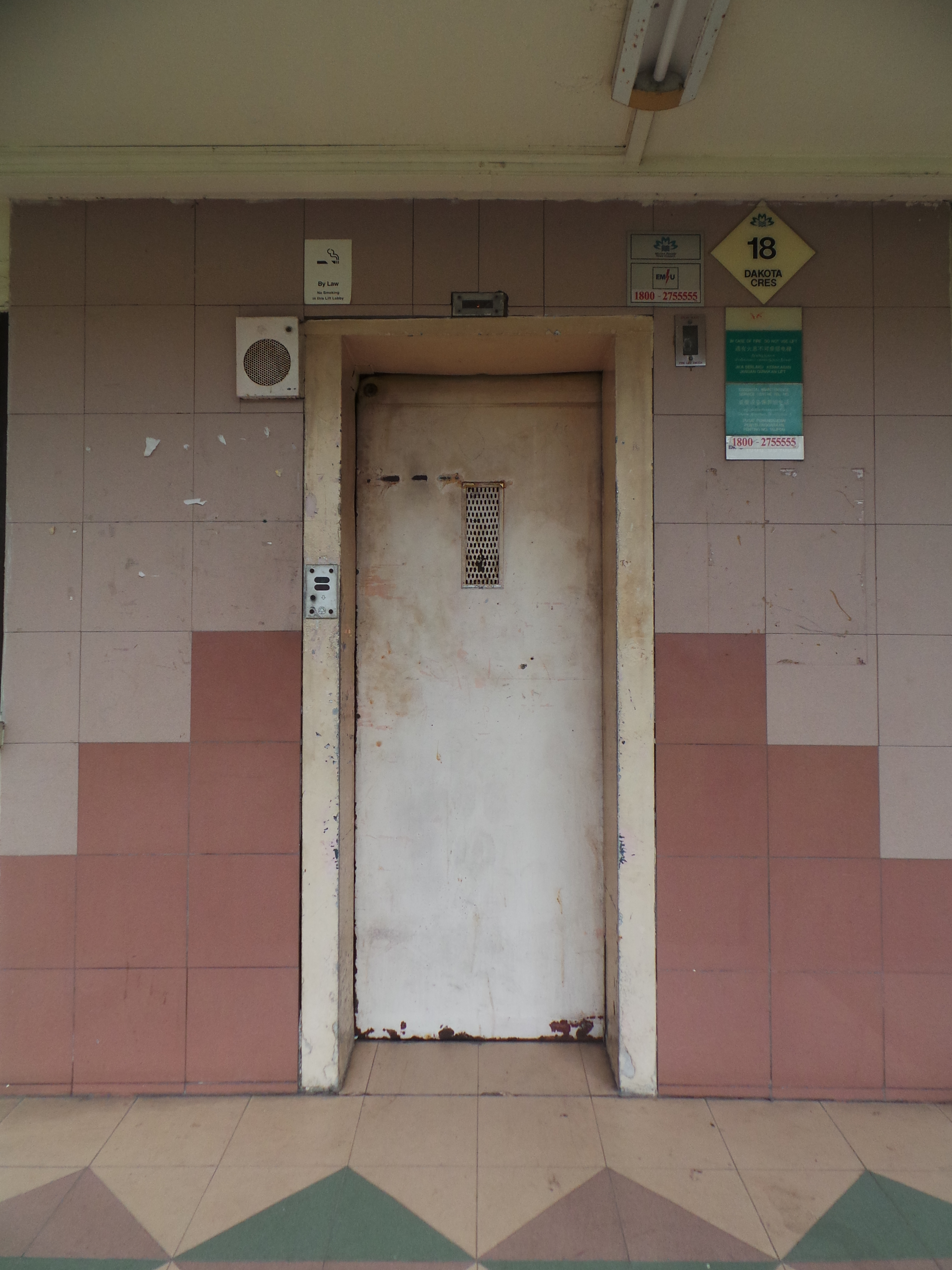
Lifts at Dakota

The lifts at Dakota Crescent, installed by Schindler in 1958, were in working condition until 2017 despite being very old and different from the ones used in modern HDB flats. They stop only on certain floors instead of every floor and hence can be quite inconvenient for residents, especially the elderly and the handicapped. Furthermore, there are only two people left in Singapore who can give maintenance or repair these lifts if they break down. The lifts are also placed on slightly higher grounds (Figure 34) and this elevation serves as flood mitigation for the estate, which used to be prone to floods whenever it rained. These lifts were shut down in 2017.

== Housing ==
Dakota Crescent provides a combination of the old and the new. At one end of the street, old HDB blocks still exist, while new high rise condominiums stand at the other end. Most of the HDB blocks in Dakota have already been demolished to make way for the condominiums Dakota Residences and Waterbank at Dakota.

Dakota Crescent has over 600 one or two-room units, but only 60 percent of them are occupied, majority on a rental basis.

== Education ==
Schools that are located in Dakota Crescent include Broadrick Secondary School and Etonhouse International School.

== Transport ==
Dakota Crescent has become increasingly accessible, with two nearby MRT stations- Dakota and Mountbatten.

== Amenities ==
In addition, the popular Old Airport Road food centre at the same area provides for the main source of dining for the residents today. It was constructed in 1973 and is also a famous hotspot for tourists to taste local food.

Tian Kee & Co, an old provision shop in located at the corner of block 12, was set up by a couple in 1958. After being sold in 2013, the old provision shop was converted into a retro-styled café subsequently. The café ceased operations since 30 December 2016 due to Dakota Crescent being listed as one of the estates under the SERS.

=== Dove playground ===
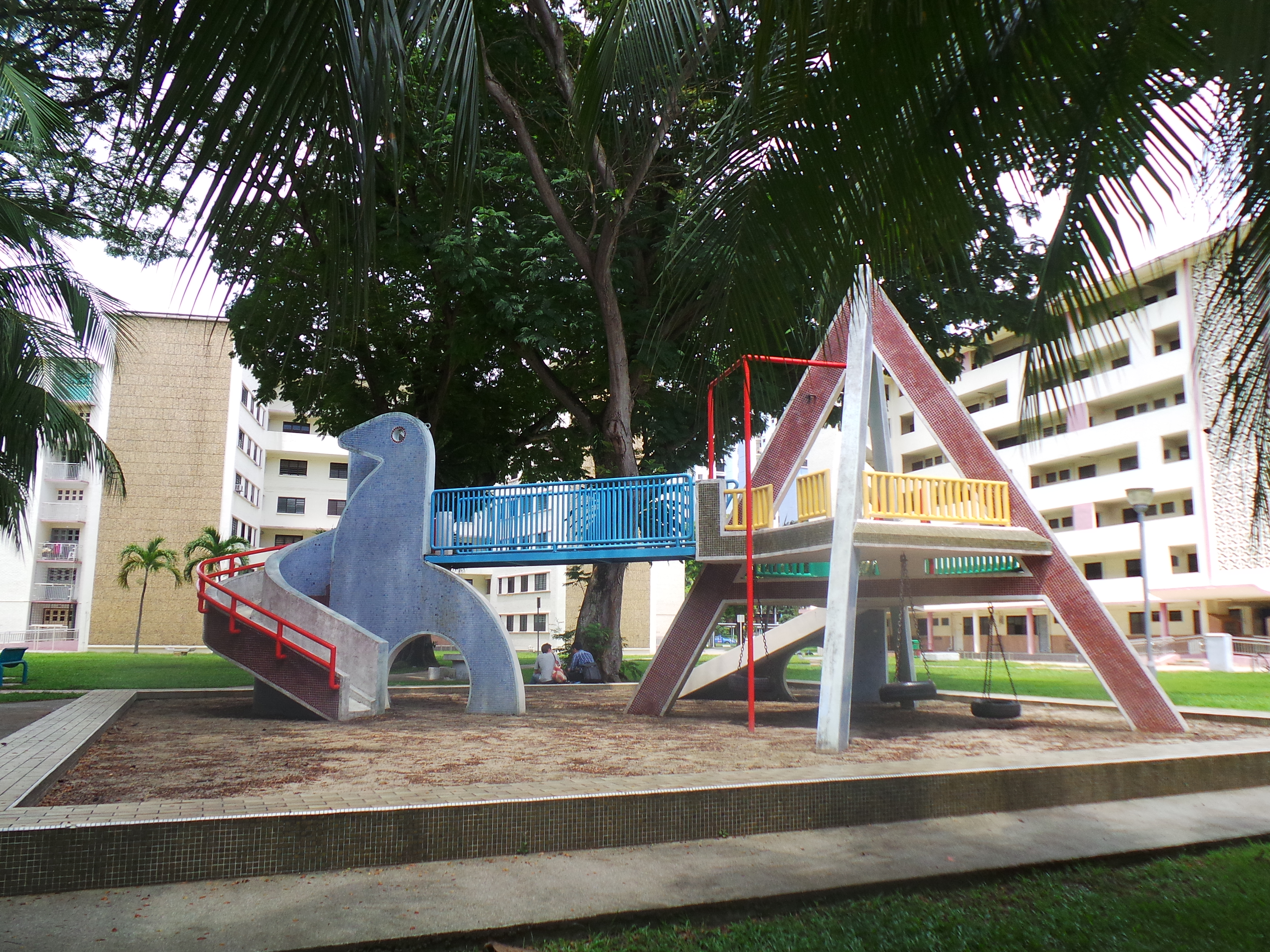
Dove Playground

The Dove Playground was designed by Khor Ean Ghee in 1979. Khor had been asked by HDB to come up with play spaces for a new generation of public housing that would “go beyond providing just a roof over Singaporeans’ heads". Even though he had no experience in designing playgrounds, Khor began creating playgrounds based on animals and local icons like rickshaws. The dove playground was one of his designs for the series of animal-inspired adventure playgrounds.

One of the residents, Xue Ling, mentioned that the playground often gets flooded when it rains, and that she would put on her swimsuit to swim in the muddy water with her sister.

Besides children, adults also gather around here for conversations and social bonding. Madam Yee, a resident of more than 35 years, said, “What I like most about this place is the friendship that I’ve forged throughout the years. I live alone and it’s good that my neighbours check up on me when they have the time. Sometimes if I get bored, I go down to the playground and chitchat with them. When all of us have to shift out in 2016, hopefully, the bond between our neighbours will remain intact.”

== Geylang River ==
A portion of the Geylang River runs nearby to Dakota Crescent which resulted in frequent flooding in the area. Crocodiles were used to be spotted by residents crawling out of the river and came near to the kampongs. Geylang river was subsequently canalized which prevented flooding. Park connector is aligned along the river, providing family activities for the nearby residents.

== Conservation efforts and public awareness ==
A ‘Save Dakota Crescent’ campaign was started in 2014 by a group of architects to save Dakota Crescent. Led by architect Jonathan Poh, they put together a conservation paper to save 12 blocks of flats and transform it into a mixed-used complex with offices, food and beverages businesses and residential units for rent. The paper has been submitted to the Ministry of National Development.

This campaign was set up as its founders felt that Dakota Crescent had a unique architecture- one that had open spaces, iconic buildings and an interesting streetscape. Thus, it was a piece of history that they wanted to keep, for the future generation and as a part of Singapore's heritage.

Other than its architectural significance, Dakota also has a historical and social significance. Many residents still hold fond memories of the place, as can be seen by the personal recounts above, and has appealed to the government to conserve certain parts of this estate. Some of these residents have joined the campaign led by the architects. Dakota Crescent has a huge historical significance, as it was one of the first housing estates to be built in response to the increasing population.

Projects that the group has embarked on include conducting walking trails for people who wanted to know more about the history and architecture of the estate. The walking trails are conducted by the residents of Dakota. This makes the trails more interactive for visitors, rather than walking about the estate on their own. Furthermore, these residents can share their personal experiences about the estate with the visitors, enhancing their understanding about the social significance of Dakota. The group has also created Facebook page ‘Save Dakota Crescent’ to raise awareness about their plans to the members of the public. ‘Dakota Adventures’ also consists of a group of people giving Dakota Crescent tours to raise more awareness.

== In popular culture ==
Dakota Crescent was also the site of the movie 3688 (2015) by director Royston Tan and Singaporean blockbuster drama series Hero (2016).

As part of the community theatre project IgnorLand by local theatre company Drama Box, Dakota Crescent was featured in its fourth installation in 2016. Residents of Dakota Crescent also participated in the performances.
