= Old Airport Road, Singapore =

Road in Singapore

Old Airport Road
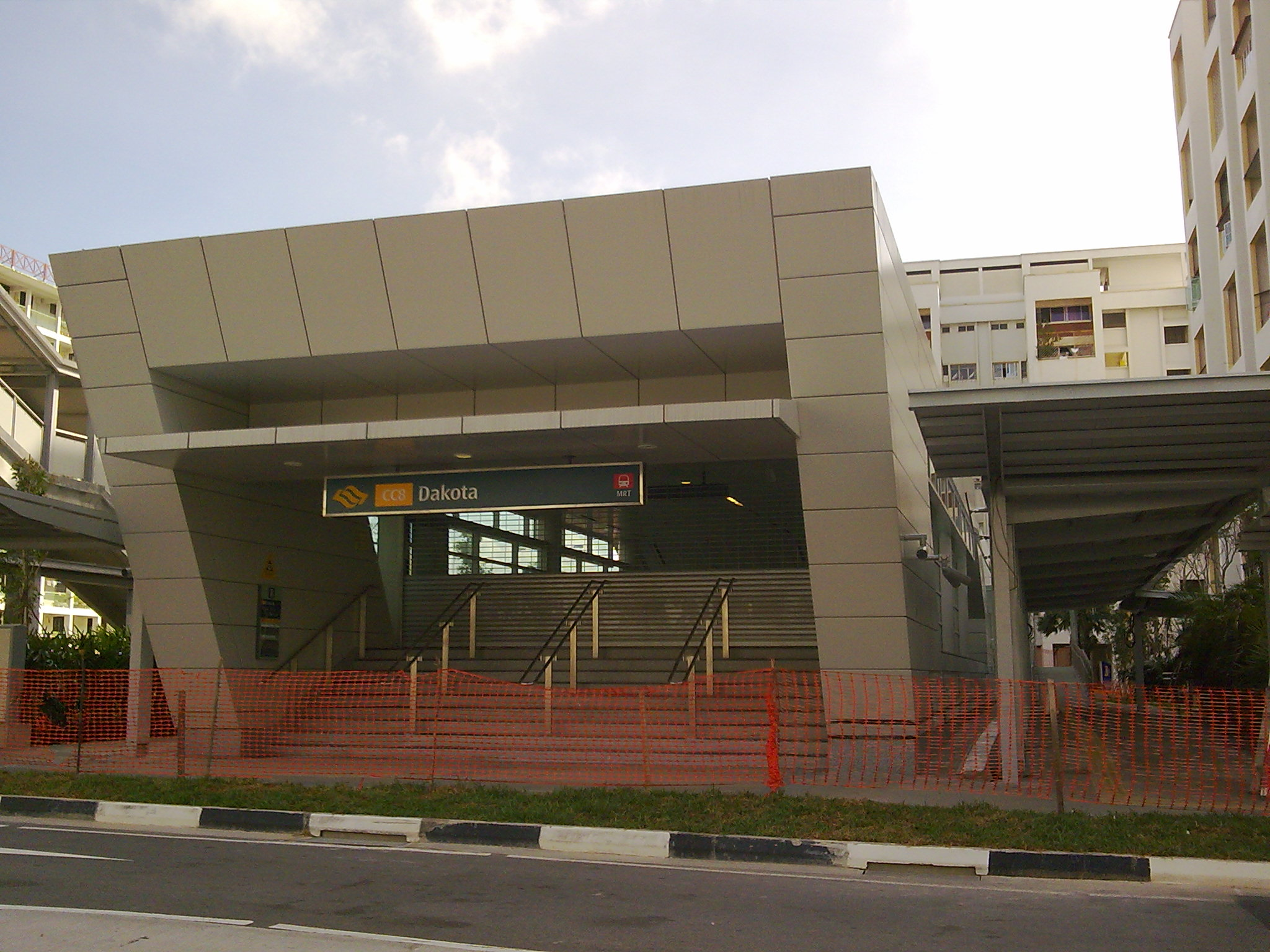
- Dakota MRT station with flats surrounding it.
- Interactive map of Old Airport Road
- Namesake: Kallang Airport
- Owner: Land Transport Authority
- Maintained by: Land Transport Authority
- Location: Mountbatten, Singapore
- Coordinates: 1.308°N 103.885°E

Old Airport Road (Chinese: 旧机场路) is a two-way road in Singapore, connecting Dunman Road in the east to the junction with Stadium Boulevard and Mountbatten Road in the west.

As its name implies, the road was the eastern boundary of the former Kallang Airport, the first purpose-built civil airport in Singapore. After the closure of the Kallang Airport, the area around Old Airport Road was redeveloped into a residential estate, known today as the Old Kallang Airport Estate. Previously, the road ended on the western bank of the Geylang River, but was later extended eastwards to connect with Dunman Road.

Old Airport Road is famous for being the location of the renowned Old Airport Road Market and Food Centre. Mountbatten and Dakota MRT stations on the Circle line are located underneath Old Airport Road Food Center.
