= Goodman Arts Centre =

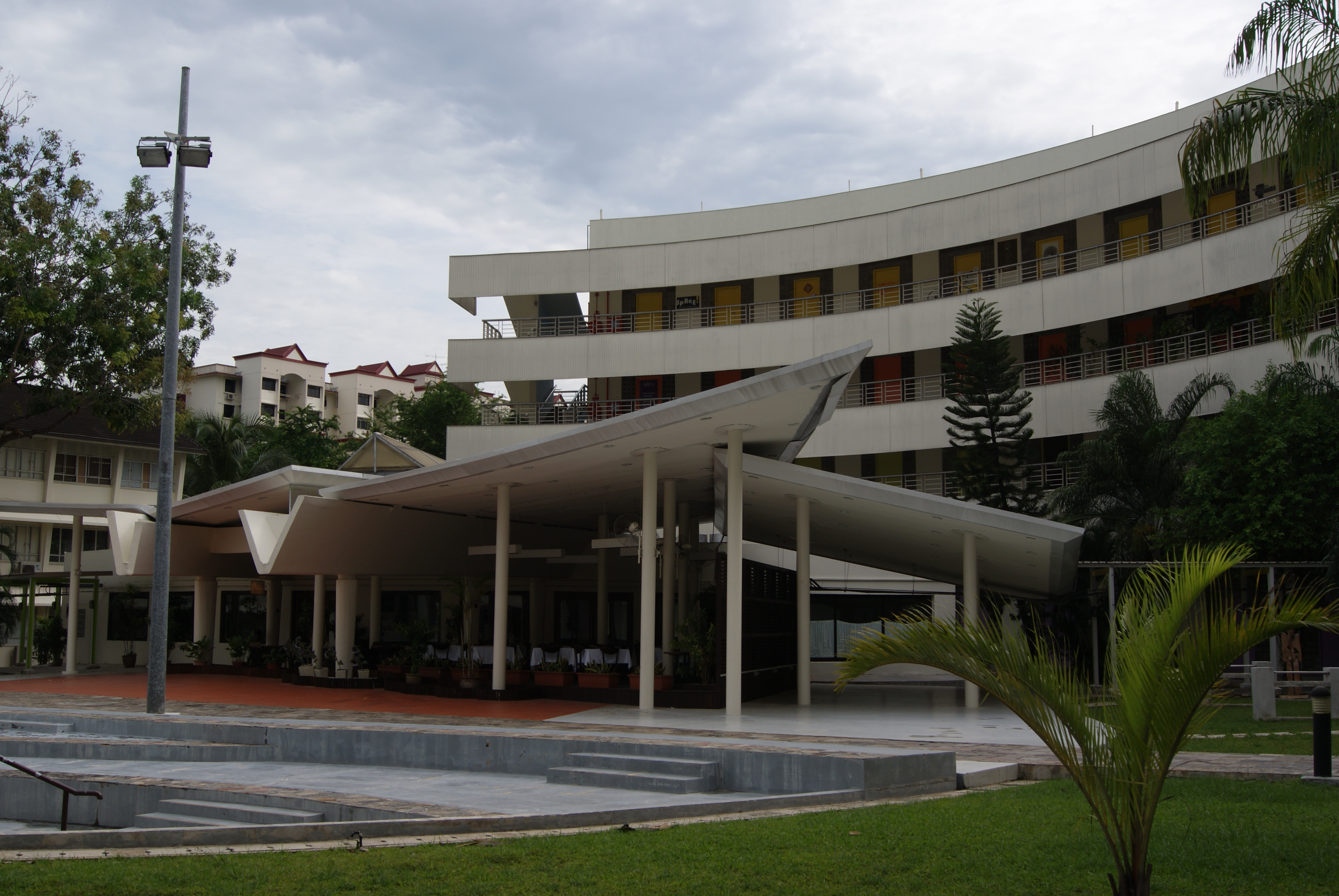
- A block in the Goodman Arts Centre

General information
- Status: Completed
- Location: 90 Goodman Road, Singapore
- Opened: 1960s (building built); Early 2011 (opening of Goodman Arts Centre)

Other information
- Number of units: 77

The Goodman Arts Centre is an arts centre in Mountbatten, Singapore. The arts centre has 15 blocks, all of which have modernist architecture. It also houses the corporate office of the National Arts Council (NAC).

Prior to the being an arts centre, the Goodman Arts Centre's building was used as a campus for three different schools at different points from the 1960s to early 2010. In December 2010, the NAC announced that the building would be redeveloped as the Goodman Arts Centre as part of an overhaul for subsidising housing for artists. The Goodman Arts Centre opened in early 2011.

Artists who stay in the Goodman Arts Centre have praised the building's architecture and greenery for providing them inspiration. However, they have also criticised the suitability of the building's facilities.

== History ==
=== Prior tenants ===
The Goodman Arts Centre was first occupied by the Tun Seri Lanang Malay Secondary School between the 1960s and the late 1980s. From 1993 to 1995, the building was expanded for the then-new Lasalle College of the Arts, and new facilities for the school were built. However, the School of the Arts moved into the building in April 2007, with Lasalle moving out by July; SOTA later moved out in January 2010.

=== Art Housing Scheme ===
In December 2010, the National Arts Council (NAC) announced that the building will be redeveloped into the Goodman Arts Centre as part of an overhaul for the Art Housing Scheme, a programme that converted old buildings to provide subsidised housing for artists and art groups. By the time the Goodman Arts Centre was announced, the NAC found out that artists often occupy their allocated spaces for extended periods of time, making it difficult for prospective artists to secure space under the Art Housing Scheme, according to editor Terence Chong. Furthermore, artistic interactions under the scheme were found by the NAC to be limited.

Redevelopment of the Goodman Arts Centre was expected to cost S$9 million (US$6.72 million), and the number of available spaces was to increase from 96 to 144 tenants. Newspaper TODAY reported that many artists reacted positively to this announcement, though some expressed concerns on the concept of sharing a space or older artists adjusting to the new scheme. The Goodman Arts Centre opened in early 2011.

== Details ==
The Goodman Arts Centre is located in the Mountbatten neighbourhood. Situated between Mountbatten Road and Goodman Road, the compound has 15 blocks. Editor Terence Chong describes the building as having a "peaceful ambience unlike the frenzied atmosphere in Little India" due to its greenery and 1960s modernist architecture, and according to him, artists under the Art Housing Scheme attribute the aforementioned elements of the Goodman Arts Centre as "inspirational".

Furthermore, they also felt that the building provided legitimised their work and gave them permanence. However, artists under the scheme also voiced discontent with various facilities within the building, such as the lack of en suite toilets and narrow stairways. The Goodman Arts Centre also houses the corporate office of the NAC as the NAC wanted a closer working relationship with artists. As of 2026, the Goodman Arts Centre offers 77 units, according to Ong Sor Fern of The Straits Times.
