= Kallang Airport =

Former airport in Singapore (1937–1955)

Kallang Airport Lapangan Terbang Kallang (Malay) 加冷机场 (Chinese) காலாங் விமான நிலையம் (Tamil)
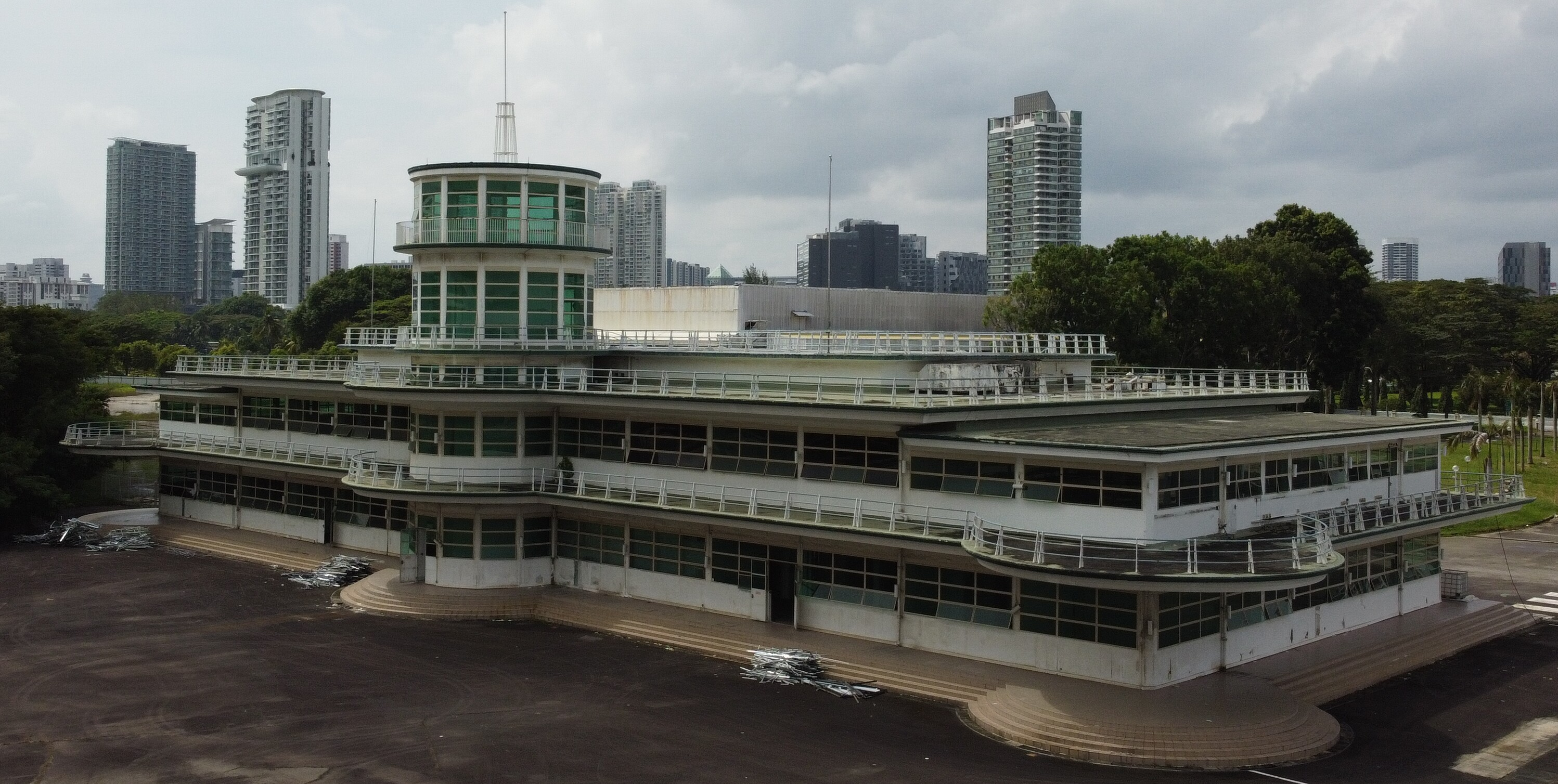
- The former control tower of Kallang Airport
- IATA: 3990; ICAO: 3990

Summary
- Airport type: Defunct
- Owner: Government of Singapore
- Serves: Singapore
- Location: 9 Kallang Airport Way, Singapore 397750
- Opened: 12 June 1937; 89 years ago
- Closed: 21 August 1955; 71 years ago
- Hub for: Wearne's Air Service (1937–1941); Malayan Airways (1947–1955)
- Coordinates: 01°18′26.68″N 103°52′24.16″E
- Interactive map of Kallang Airport

Runways
Direction	Length		Surface
Direction	m	ft	Surface
06/24 (expunged)	1,676	5,500	Asphalt (Closed)

Kallang Airport (Chinese: 加冷机场, Malay: Lapangan Terbang Kallang, Tamil: காலாங் விமான நிலையம்) was the first purpose-built civil international airport of Singapore. Built on reclaimed mangrove swampland and opened in 1937, it was closed in 1955 as larger aircraft demanded longer runways. Kallang Airport is reputed as being formerly one of the busiest airports in Southeast Asia and was also visited by the famed pilot Amelia Earhart in 1937. Now mostly redeveloped, the original Terminal Building, East and West Blocks and one hangar make up "Former Kallang Airport Conservation Area".

== Etymology ==
Kallang Airport was named after the planning area it stood in, Kallang, which in turn was named after a group of orang laut that inhabited in the area in the 1800s.

== History ==
The Sunday Times on 13 June 1937, reporting on the opening of Kallang Airport by Governor Shenton Thomas

=== Origins ===
Construction on the Kallang Airport began in 1931, after Sir Cecil Clementi had allocated a strategic spot for the airport to be built, which included reclaiming land from the mangrove swamp at the edge of the Kallang River. Malay villages that stood in the area were bulldozed, with their inhabitants being moved to a newer established village in Bedok, known as Kampung Melayu. Kallang Airport was completed in 1935, with three Hawker Hart bomber planes from the carrier HMS Hermes being the first aircraft to land there on 21 November 1935. Then on 12 June 1937, Sir Shenton Thomas, then the Governor of the Straits Settlements, officially declared that Kallang Airport was now open to the public.

It was the first purpose-built civil international airport to be established in Singapore. Upon its opening, the British colonial authorities as well as administrative personnel from abroad took an interest in the new airport, even describing it as the best British airport due to its larger and more advanced facilities. In the same year of its opening, Amelia Earhart stopped over at the airport and left with high praise of it, claiming that the airport was an "aviation miracle of the East."

=== World War II ===
During the Second World War, the Japanese Army occupied the airport. They demolished the original runway, which was made of grass, and instead replaced the old one with a new runway made from concrete. Japanese fighter aircraft made stopovers at the airport until the end of the Second World War, allowing civil aviation to enter in 1949, four years after the Japanese forces had pulled out of Singapore.

=== Postwar ===
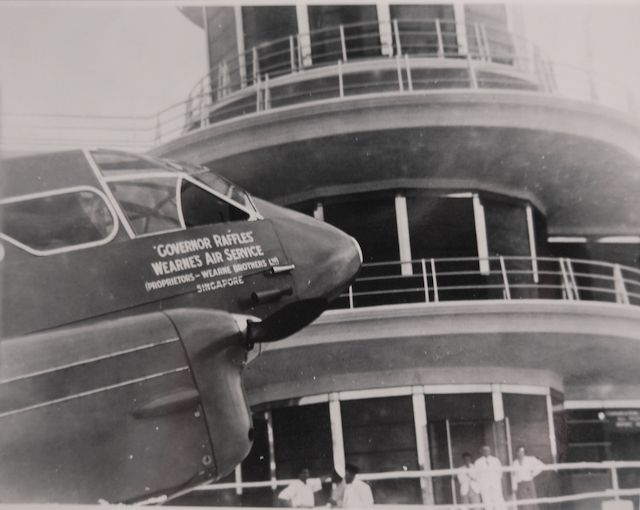
Wearne's Air Service aircraft gracing the Kallang Airport runway, with the control tower standing tall in the background

In 1950, Kallang Airport was ranked as the second busiest airport in Southeast Asia, prompting plans to build a new airport at Paya Lebar in order to ease the congestions. When the new airport, a larger structure, was completed in 1955, the Kallang Airport gradually began to cease operations, with the Singapore Youth Sports Council taking over ownership of the old airport buildings at the site.

On 18 March 1956, a group of 20,000 protestors formed a rally at the premises of the disused Kallang Airport, with speeches by political figured including David Marshall (1908–1955), the first Chief Minister of Singapore. This rally was part of a nationalist uprising for the independence of Singapore. When police forces showed up as crowd control, the march escalated into a riot that resulted in the deaths of 50 people, with damage done to the main terminal building of the airport. The incident tainted the reputation of David Marshall in the eyes of the British and also delayed discussions for Singapore's independence.

=== Post-independence ===
After Singapore had been officially independent in 1965, the airport was used as the headquarters of the People's Action Party (PAP). The main terminal of the airport was turned into the main quarters and administrative unit, with one of the towers being converted into a youth community centre. From 1967 to 1972, the premises of the airport were also used by the CMPB as grounds for enlisting male citizens into National Service. In the late 1960s, the airport runway was demolished, with the National Stadium being built in place of it.

In 1994, the former airport building, which had again been disused, was reopened after conservation works had been carried out. The former airport building, as well as what remained of its premises, including the towers and gateway, were later gazetted for conservation by the Urban Redevelopment Authority (URA) in 2008. Plans were also drawn to convert the old airport into a lifestyle hub and leisure park in a future redevelopment of the areas near the Kallang River.

Kallang Airport was used as the main venue to exhibit contemporary artworks in the 2011 Singapore Biennale, an annual local visual arts exhibition. It was also exhibited at the Asian Civilisations Museum in 2012.

== Flight incidents ==
- On 7 November 1941, a Royal Air Force de Havilland Tiger Moth piloted by Flight Lieutenant Alec Wills was hit from behind by a landing Brewster Buffalo of No. 243 Squadron RAF, resulting in Wills' death.
- On 29 June 1946, a C-47 Dakota aircraft belonging to the Royal Air Force with 20 RAF Police NCOs on board crashed at the airport in a storm with no survivors.
- On 13 March 1954, a Lockheed Constellation operated by BOAC, registered G-ALAM crashed while attempting to land at Kallang Airport en route from Sydney to London. The accident killed all 31 passengers, plus 2 crew; another seven crew escaped the burning aircraft with injuries. An investigation of the incident found that the most probable cause of the crash was pilot fatigue, but there was a serious problem of "inadequate response of the fire and rescue services."

== Legacy ==
What remains of the Kallang Airport is the main terminal building, a tower, two hangars, as well as lamposts and a courtyard.

Several pieces of local infrastructure pay homage to the former airport. The old runway near Mountbatten Road is known as Old Airport Road. The surrounding public flats are named the Old Kallang Airport Estate. The estate is served by the Dakota MRT station, which took its name from the C-47 Dakota aircraft which used to land at the Kallang Airport.

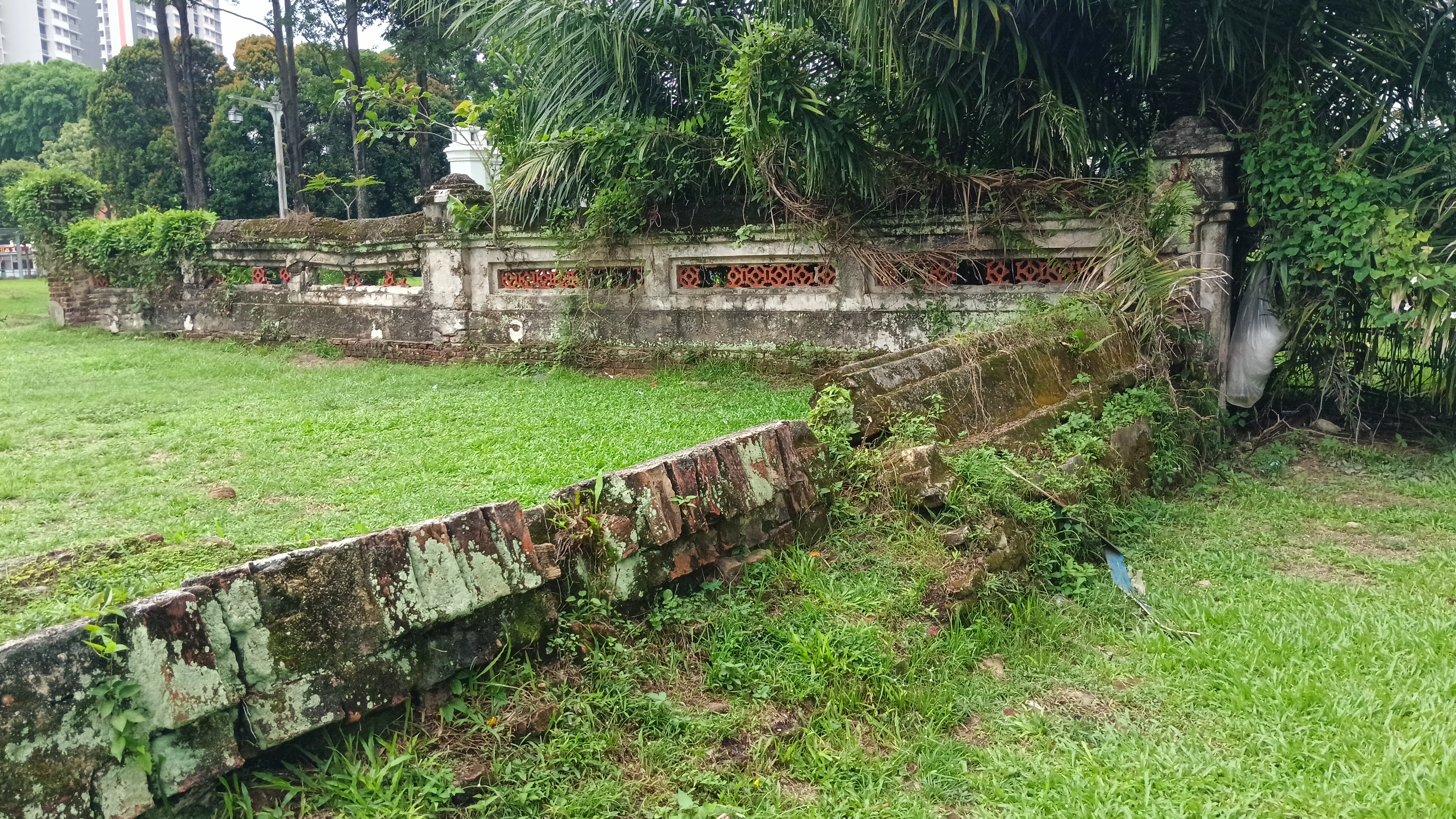
Ruins of an old Muslim cemetery next to the gateway.

Aside from the main buildings of the disused airport, ruins of an old gateway to the airport can be seen near the Kallang MRT station. Next to this ruined gateway is what remains of a late 19th-century keramat and cemetery belonging to Siti Maryam, a Sunni Muslim merchant and an immigrant from Baghdad, Iraq. This cemetery was exhumed in April 2011, leaving behind only the exterior walls, which themselves are in a state of dilapidation.

== See also ==
- Battle of Singapore
- Far East Air Force (Royal Air Force)
- Former Overseas RAF bases
