= Alec Wills =

English cricketer and Royal Air Force officer

Personal information
- Full name: Alec Percy Stanley Wills
- Born: 11 March 1911; Trincomalee, Eastern Province, British Ceylon
- Died: 7 November 1941 (aged 30); Kallang, Singapore
- Batting: Right-handed
- Bowling: Unknown

Career statistics
Competition	First-class
Matches	1
Runs scored	3
Batting average	–
100s/50s	0/0
Top score	3*
Balls bowled	48
Wickets	0
Bowling average	–
5 wickets in innings	0
10 wickets in match	0
Best bowling	–
Catches/stumpings	0/–
- Source: Cricinfo, 2 March 2019

Alec Percy Stanley Wills (11 March 1911 – 7 November 1941) was an English first-class cricketer and Royal Air Force officer. Enlisting in the Royal Air Force from Haileybury in 1932, Wills played first-class cricket for the Combined Services cricket team, before being posted to Malaya in the Second World War, where he was killed in a plane accident in November 1941.

== Life and military career ==
Born at Trincomalee in British Ceylon, Wills was educated in England at Haileybury. After leaving Haileybury, Wills was commissioned into the Royal Air Force as a pilot officer in January 1932, with confirmation in the rank in December 1932. He was promoted to the rank of flying officer in July 1933. Three years later, in July 1936, Wills was promoted to the rank of flight lieutenant. He played cricket for the Royal Air Force cricket team in 1936, in a minor match against the Royal Navy at Lord's, with Wills excelling in the match with a half century and bowling figures of 6 for 71. He featured again for the Royal Air Force in a minor match against the Army, taking 5 for 60 in the Army's first-innings. He made one appearance in first-class cricket for the Combined Services cricket team against the touring New Zealanders in 1937 at Portsmouth. Batting once during the match, he ended the Combined Services first-innings unbeaten on 3, while across both of the New Zealanders innings' he bowled a total of eight overs, conceding 36 runs.

At the outbreak of the Second World War, he was posted to British Malaya as a pilot instructor. Wills was killed in an accident on 7 November 1941, when the Tiger Moth he was flying was hit from behind by a landing Buffalo of 243 Squadron at Kallang. He was buried at Kranji War Cemetery.
