= Wearne's Air Service =

Airline in Malaya and Singapore (1937–1941)

Wearne's Air Service (WAS)
- Founded: 1937
- Ceased operations: 1941
- Hubs: Kallang Airport
- Fleet size: 4
- Destinations: 8
- Parent company: Messrs. Wearne's Air Service Limited
- Headquarters: 45, Orchard Road, Singapore, Strait Settlements
- Key people: Charles Wearne (Director); Theodore Wearne (Director)

Wearne's Air Service (WAS), established in 1937, was an early Malayan airline.

Based in Kallang Airport, Singapore, it emerged as one of the earliest airlines in the region. WAS operated a diverse range of air services, including scheduled passenger flights, charter operations, aerial photography, land surveying, cargo and air mail transportation. Additionally, the airline is alternatively referred to as Wearne's Air Services or Wearnes Air Services.

== History ==
=== Founding ===
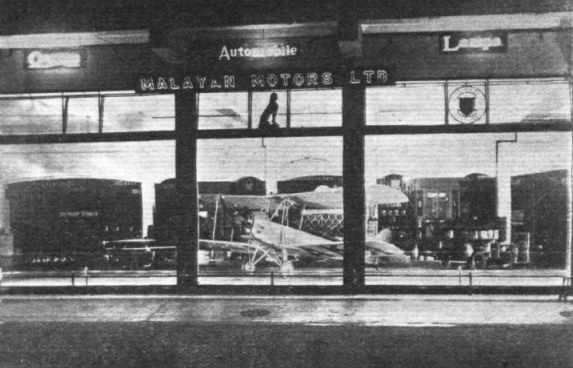
Charles Wearne unveils the Avro Avian plane, assembled at Malayan Motors in 1929

The inception of Wearne's Air Service dates back to 1906, initiated by Australian siblings Charles Frederick Foster Wearne and Theodore James Benjamin Wearne. Their establishment, C.F.F. Wearne & Company, initially concentrated on the automotive sector, evolving into Wearne Brothers Limited by 1912. Specialising in renowned automobile brands including Oldsmobiles, Rolls-Royces and Fords, the company diversified its operations to encompass motorized services throughout Southeast Asia. In tandem with this expansion, subsidiary automotive companies were established to manage Wearne's various agencies, starting with Malayan Motors.

In 1929, the aspiration for air transport took root when Charles Wearne envisioned providing air services in Malaya. To realise this dream, he imported an Avro Avian plane to be assembled by the mechanics at Malayan Motors. The unveiling of the plane at Malayan Motors' showroom generated significant interest, marking a significant step towards the realization of Charles Wearne's vision.

A crucial development unfolded with the establishment of Kallang Airport in 1937. This new aviation hub not only provided essential infrastructure but also played a pivotal role in laying the groundwork for the emergence of local airlines. Inspired by a vision for airborne transportation, Charles Wearne turned his attention to aviation, ultimately leading to the Wearne's Air Service.

=== Delivery, test flight and inauguration ===
A 1937 gathering of enthusiasts and onlookers in front of the De Havilland Dragon Rapide aircraft

Wearne's Air Service (WAS) commenced its historic journey on 20 June 1937, with the reception of its first aircraft, the de Havilland Dragon Rapide named Governor Raffles. This inaugural aircraft, symbolising the onset of a new era for the airline, was formally announced during the delivery ceremony commemorating its arrival from England, led by Charles Wearne, the director of Wearne's Air Services.

The notable flight, piloted by Flight Lieut. J. B. W. Pugh, the company's chief pilot, accompanied by his wife and Mr. J.G. Boehm, the company's chief ground engineer, included a delivery journey lasting 17 days from England, with stops in various locations such as Benghazi, Cairo, Baghdad, Calcutta, Victoria Point, Penang, and Malacca. The airline's objective was to design a route connecting Singapore to Penang, strategically incorporating a stopover in Kuala Lumpur.

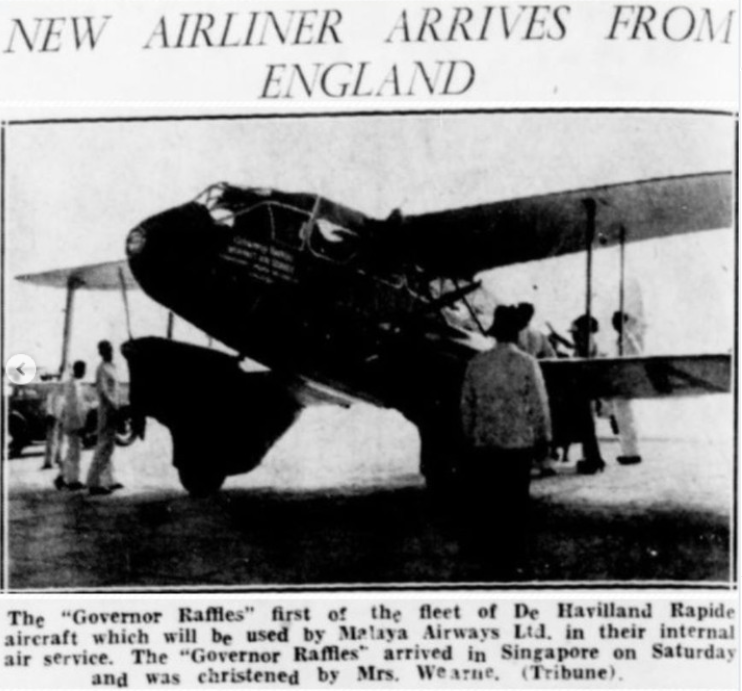
Malaya Tribune, 21 June 1937, reporting on the arrival of the new aircraft from England

During the aircraft delivery ceremony, Charles Wearne shared the visionary plans for the airline's expansion. He revealed that once suitable landing fields became available, the flight itinerary would be extended to include destinations such as Kota Bharu, Ipoh, Malacca, Fraser's Hill, Cameron Highlands and other key centers in both Malaya and Borneo. The new service shortened travel times, making Singapore accessible within 1½ hours of Kuala Lumpur and 3¼ hours of Penang, operating on Mondays, Wednesdays, and Saturdays, returning on the same day.

Two days before the scheduled inauguration of its service on 29 June 1937, Wearne's Air Service (WAS) executed a pivotal test flight on 25 June 1937. Departing from Singapore at 6:58 am with five passengers on board, the flight was bound for Penang via Kuala Lumpur. In Kuala Lumpur, the aircraft showcased demonstration flights upon its arrival from Singapore. The test flight concluded with the aircraft landing back in Singapore at 6:33 pm. This pre-service test flight played a crucial role in verifying the aircraft's operational readiness, ensuring a seamless operation as WAS prepared for its historic scheduled service.

On 28 June 1937, WAS achieved a significant milestone with the commencement of its first official service. Utilizing the DH.89 Dragon Rapide aircraft, the flight traversed from Singapore to Penang with a stop in Kuala Lumpur. Beyond its role in transporting airmail, the inaugural service also accommodated several passengers.

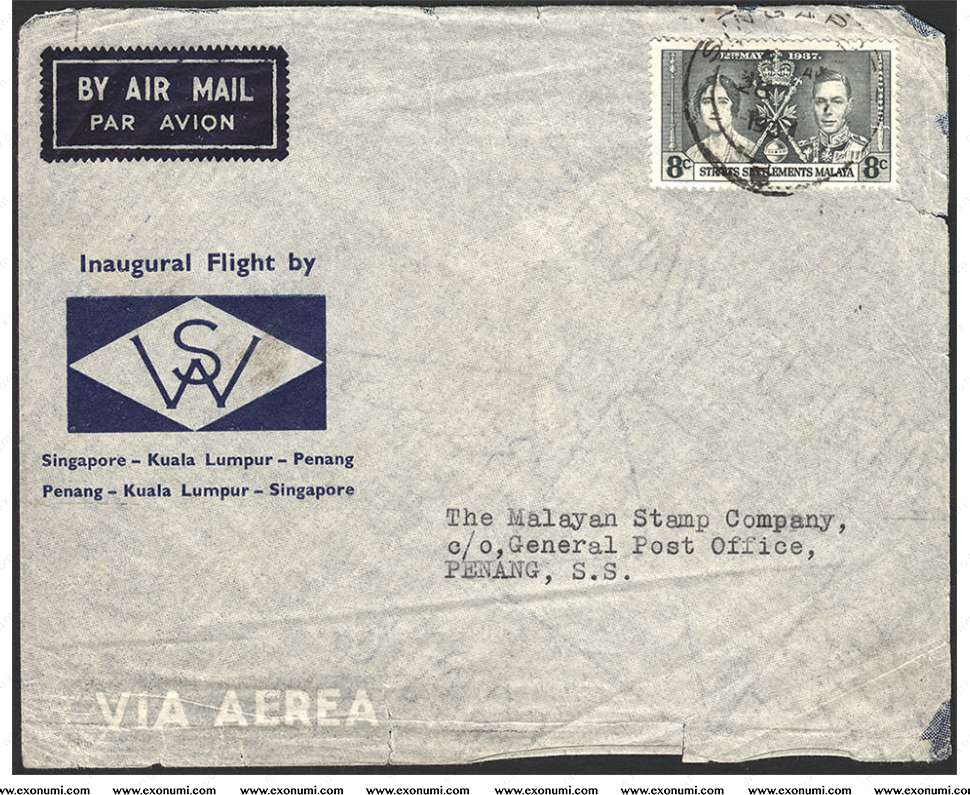
Wearne's Air Service inaugural flight cover, issued on 28 June 1937

=== Network and fleet expansion ===
During its inaugural month of operations, Wearne's Air Service (WAS) achieved a notable milestone by carrying a total of 142 passengers. This early success laid the foundation for the airline's expansion, emphasized by the acquisition of a second aircraft, named Governor Fullerton, which was transported to Singapore via a steamship. Notably, this new aircraft arrived on 24 August 1937, enabling WAS to increase its service frequency to daily operations from 25 September onwards, except on Sundays.

In a subsequent phase of development, WAS expanded its services to Alor Setar, inaugurating a weekly Saturday flight from 2 April 1938. Simultaneously, the airline broadened its network by introducing a daily flight to Ipoh later that year. The airline had aspirations to enhance its network even more by including Johore, Port Swettenham and Setiawan among its growing list of destinations.

Impressed by the efficiency of Wearne's Air Services, the government has deemed it justifiable to provide financial assistance to maintain the service. The Colonial Secretary announced the decision of the Governor to grant an annual subsidy to the airline, with the subsidy for 1938 set at $25,000.

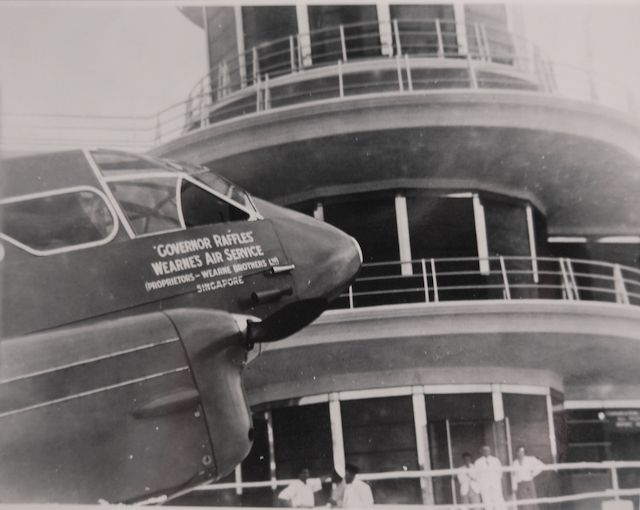
Governor Raffles, pictured in 1937

As WAS continued its growth trajectory, the airline demonstrated signs of potential expansion by expressing interest in purchasing new aircraft. Recognising the evolving demands of its expanding network, this move indicated WAS's strategic approach to securing the necessary resources for future growth.

WAS received an additional two new de Havilland Express airliners on 14 July 1938. This significant fleet expansion marked a doubling of the company's aircraft. The introduction of these larger four-engine aircraft, with a higher capacity of 12 passengers compared to the previous Rapide models' capacity of 8, facilitated the implementation of a daily flight between Singapore and Penang. The newly acquired aircraft were named Governor Murchison and Governor Ibbetson, respectively.

Moreover, in response to the runway at Ipoh being deemed too short for the new aircraft, the airline temporarily suspended services to Ipoh. Instead, Sitiawan was utilized as an alternative, with the airline providing motor transfer services to transport passengers, mail, and freight from Sitiawan to Ipoh.

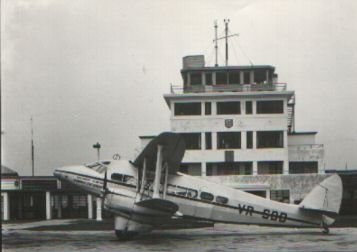
Governor Murchison, a de Havilland Express, in 1938

Despite these expansion efforts, the financial report revealed a notable setback, with Wearne's Air Service incurring a $78,000 loss for the fiscal year from 1 October 1937, to 30 September 1938. This financial challenge persisted despite the annual subsidy of $25,000 provided by the Governments of the Straits Settlements and the Federated Malay States. Nevertheless, the internal aerial transport system in Malaya, operated by Wearne's Air Service, is set to continue its operations. This information was disclosed during the annual general meeting, chaired by Mr. Charles Wearne.

=== Regional connectivity ===
In another significant development, WAS undertook a survey flight to Sarawak on 17 January 1939, in response to an invitation from Charles Vyner Brooke, Rajah of Sarawak. The purpose of the flight was to assess opportunities for establishing flights to the newly constructed Kuching Aerodrome. The journey from Singapore to Sarawak took approximately 3 1/2 hours, while the return leg, affected by headwinds, took 4 hours. Both parties expressed optimism about the potential development of scheduled biweekly flights between Kuching and Singapore in the near future. Notably, the Ranee of Sarawak was among the passengers on the return flight to Singapore, marking a significant achievement in Sarawak's aviation history as it represented the inaugural operations at the newly established Kuching aerodrome.

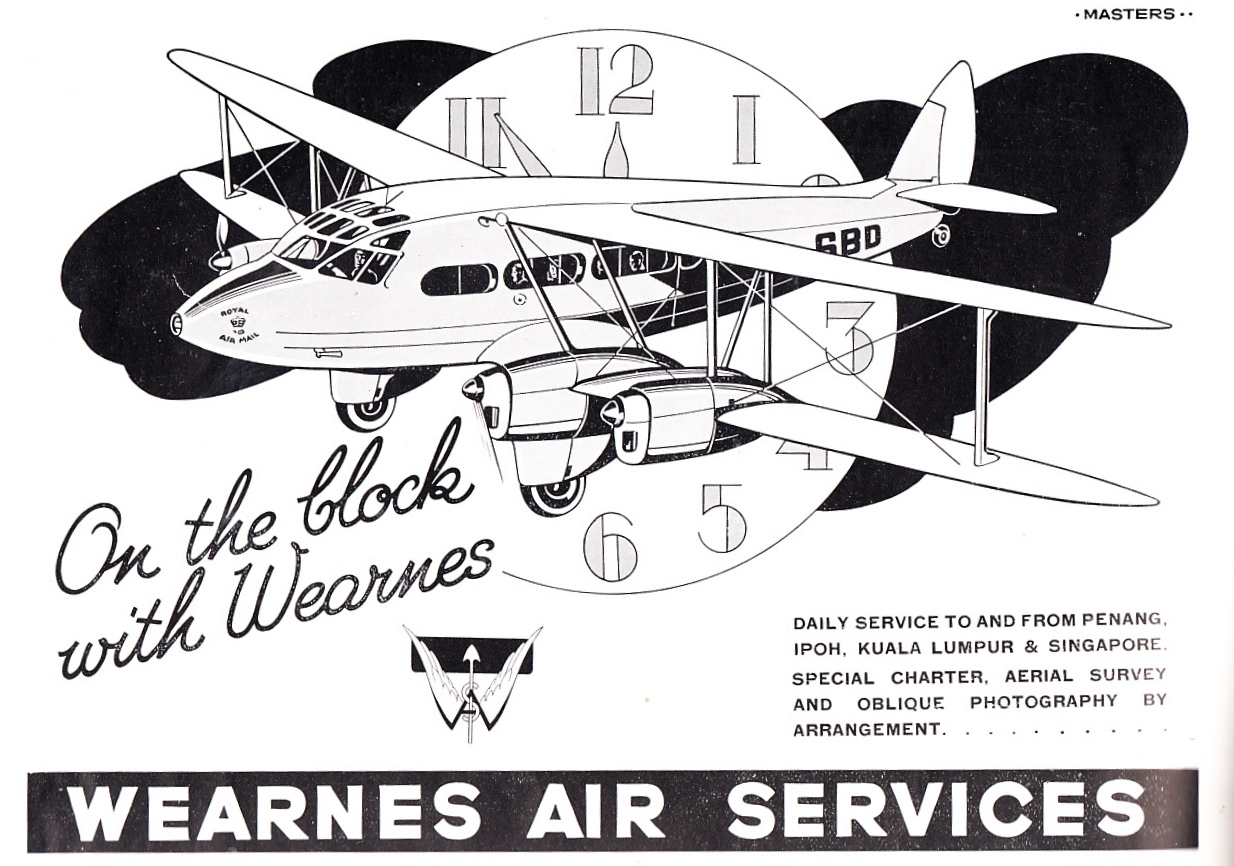
A 1938 advertisement for De Havilland Express

In a subsequent development, WAS introduced Taiping on 16 February 1939. The daily flight from Singapore-Kuala Lumpur-Ipoh/Setiawan-Penang would now operate three times daily, while the remaining four days would be directed to Singapore-Kuala Lumpur-Taiping-Penang. Nonetheless, from 27 June 1939, the company announced the resumptipon of a regular stop in Ipoh instead of Taiping.

Expanding its network further, Kota Bharu was introduced on 3 April 1940. This addition meant that the flight from Penang to Kota Bharu would significantly reduce the current land service time from 27 hours to just 1¼ hours. Before the introduction of this flight, the journey from Penang to Kota Bharu was accomplished through the Siamese railway service, taking 27 hours.

=== Wartime challenges and adaptations ===
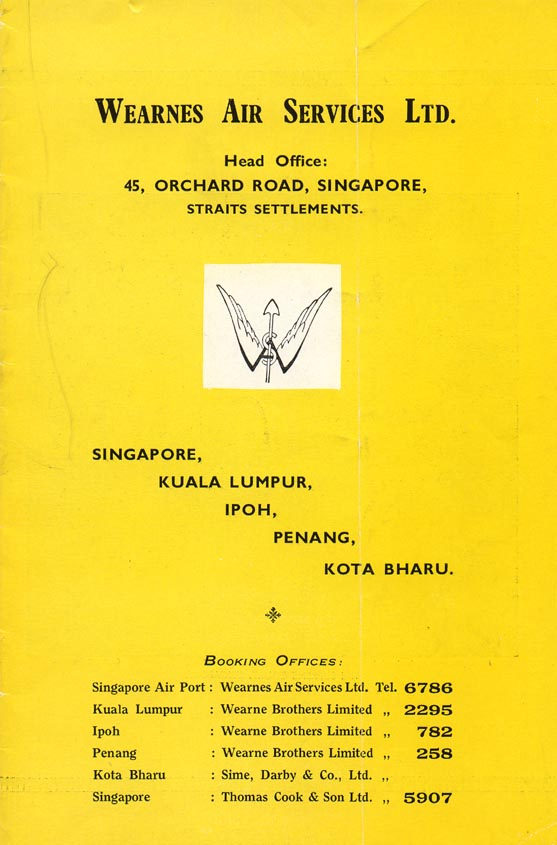
Wearne's Air Service timetable from 1940, showcasing the expanded network connecting key destinations in Malaya.

This period also highlighted Wearne's Air Services Ltd. as an essential service in a war-affected region, recognising its financial struggles and near-break-even achievement by the end of the last fiscal year. However, facing renewed losses due to decreased returns and rising operational expenses, Charles Wearne, the company's chairman, emphasized the need for a strategy to prevent further losses. In addition, he advocated for substantial government support, viewing it not merely as a subsidy but as a strategic investment, particularly in light of the essential public service rendered by Wearne's Air Services.

In a notable turn of events, the four-engined de Havilland aircraft is being proposed for sale to China to serve as an air ambulance. The cost of these pre-owned airplanes is £4,500 lower than purchasing new ones. Nevertheless, the impact of the war took a toll on the Malayan internal air service. As the war commenced, there was a substantial decline in traffic according to the chairman of Wearne's Air Company. Furthermore, there was a significant rise in the price of petrol. In the midst of these challenging circumstances, both of de Havilland Express aircraft eventually sold to W.R. Carpenter Airlines of Australia in 1940.

On 4 May 1940, a tragic incident occurred during a Wearne's Air Service passenger plane's journey from Ipoh to Kuala Lumpur. The aircraft crashed into a rubber estate, claiming the lives of all passengers and crew on board. This event marked the first fatal accident for both Wearne's Air Service and Malaya. In the aftermath of the crash, schedule adjustments became necessary. The total loss of one of its two remaining aircraft led to the suspension of the daily service. Thus, the sole remaining aircraft operates on alternate days.

In August 1940, Wearne's Air Services developed plans to acquire a new DH 89 Rapide aircraft from China National Airways Corporation (CNAC) with the aim of reinstating its daily service. Following the required arrangements and the acquisition of the new aircraft from CNAC, the daily service was successfully reinstated in December 1940.

=== End of an era ===
Wearne's Air Service underwent a significant shift in its trajectory when the government assumed control of the airline just before the Japanese attack on Malaya in 1941. During World War II, WAS adapted its operations to support wartime efforts, focusing on flying charters for the army and RMAF. This strategic move was a response to the complex circumstances of wartime conditions and geopolitical changes.

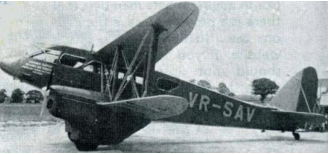
In World War II, the two aircraft from Wearne's Air Service become part of the Malayan Volunteers Air Force.

The Japanese occupation of Singapore and the Malay Peninsula marked a significant downturn for Wearne's Air Service, leading to the end of its operations during the war. The two remaining aircraft were absorbed into the Malayan Volunteers Air Force. Unfortunately, one of the aircraft met a tragic end in Ipoh on 18 December 1941, destroyed on the ground after being struck by a fragmentation bomb upon landing, resulting in the loss of both occupants on board. Another aircraft faced a comparable fate in Palembang, Sumatra, on 10 February 1942, when it was destroyed and written off after its starboard wings were sheared off by a Hawker Hurricane during an air raid.

Despite the cessation of military control after the war in 1945, the airline did not resume its services, marking the closure of an era in Southeast Asian aviation history.

=== Post-war aviation resurgence ===
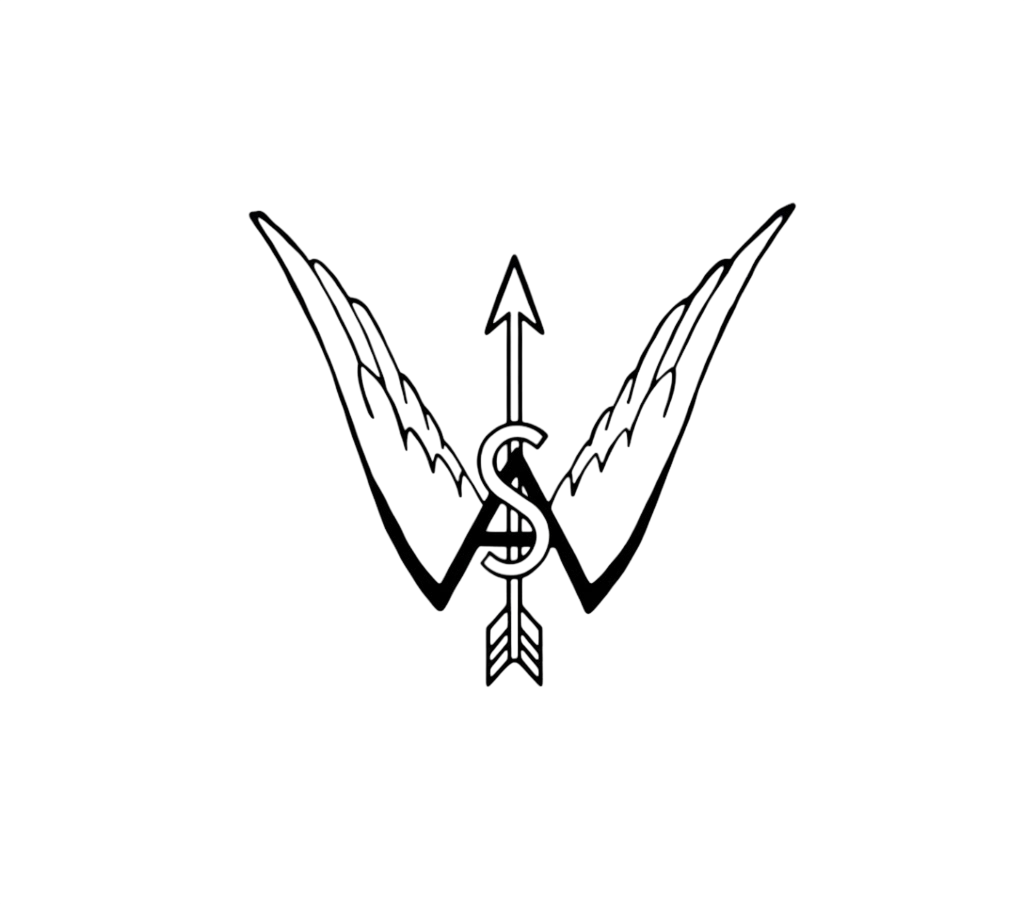
Wearne's Air Service emblem used during its operational years

After the challenging wartime experience and subsequent termination of Wearne's Air Service, a new chapter began in the Southeast Asian aviation landscape. The absence created by the discontinuation of Wearne's Air Service provided an opportunity for renewal.

The achievements of Wearne's Air Service in the 1930s garnered notable attention, prompting a collaborative effort between the Imperial Airways (later known as the British Overseas Airways Corporation or BOAC), Straits Steamship Company, and Ocean Steamship Company of Liverpool. This alliance culminated in the establishment of Malayan Airways (MAL) on 12 October 1937. Nonetheless, MAL experienced a period of inactivity as its leadership recognised the inherent difficulties in competing with Wearne's Air Service's already established dominance, additionally heightened by the relatively small market size. Moreover, amid the impending European conflict, the prospect of war reaching Malaya loomed large. In response, a strategic decision was made to conserve resources, deferring market entry until more favorable circumstances arose.

== Fleet ==
Wearne's Air Services Fleet
| Aircraft | Introduced | Retired | Total | Passengers |
|---|---|---|---|---|
| de Havilland Dragon Rapide | 1937 | 1941 | 3 | 8 |
| de Havilland Express | 1938 | 1940 | 2 | 12 |

== Destinations ==
Historically, Wearne's Air Service provided scheduled air travel services to the listed destinations:

| Country | City | Airport | Notes |
|---|---|---|---|
| Malaysia | Alor Star | Alor Star Airstrip | |
| Malaysia | Bayan Lepas | Bayan Lepas Airstrip | |
| Malaysia | Ipoh | Ipoh Airport | |
| Malaysia | Kuala Lumpur | Sungai Besi Airfield | |
| Malaysia | Kota Bharu | Pengkalan Chepa Airport | |
| Malaysia | Setiawan | Old Setiawan Airport | |
| Malaysia | Taiping | Taiping Airport | |
| Singapore | Kallang | Kallang Airport | Hub |

== Accidents and incidents ==
- 20 May 1938: A Wearne's Air Services plane had a nose-first landing during takeoff from Ipoh Aerodrome to Singapore due to a failed engine. The plane touched down on a bank, bounced, and landed on its nose near the field's edge. The pilot and five passengers were unharmed.
- 28 June 1938: Wearne's Air Service Ltd. has won a case against Dutch pilot Casper Hernrich Balke in the Singapore Civil District Court. Balke, a member of the Island Flying Club, damaged one of Wearne's planes by recklessly flying beyond the designated 3-mile radius from the aerodrome, colliding with a coconut tree over Bukit Timah. The court awarded Wearne's Air Service Ltd. $200 in compensation for the incurred damages.
- 3 May 1940: a Wearne's Air Services aircraft, en route from Penang to Singapore via Ipoh and Kuala Lumpur, tragically crashed amid a severe storm. The incident occurred on the Waterfall Estate rubber plantation near Rawang, Selangor. This incident marked the first fatalities involving air transport in Malaya, resulting in the loss of all three individuals on board.
- April 1941: A Wearne's Air Service plane en route from Kuala Lumpur to Singapore made a forced landing at Senggarang Aerodrome in Batu Pahat due to insufficient fuel. The aircraft, carrying five passengers, including three women, arrived in Singapore at 8:30 the next morning.
