= Mountbatten, Singapore =

Mountbatten
- Subzone of Marine Parade Planning Area

Name transcription(s)
  - Chinese: 蒙巴登
  - Pinyin: Méngbādēng
  - Malay: Mountbatten
  - Tamil: மவுண்ட்பேட்டன்
- Interactive map of Mountbatten
- Coordinates: 1.3142°N 103.8288°E
- Country: Singapore

Mountbatten is a neighbourhood located in the planning area of Marine Parade, Singapore.

== History ==
The neighbourhood is named after Lord Louis Mountbatten, the Supreme Allied Commander of the South East Asia Command, Governor General of India and British Military Administrator of Malaya from 1945 to 1946.

== Layout ==
Mountbatten Road is a major thoroughfare that stretches all the way from the junction with Nicoll Highway, Guillemard Road and Sims Way (where Kallang Airport Way branches out from Sims Way) in Kallang to Haig Road in Katong where it continues eastward as East Coast Road.

== Amenities ==
=== Education ===
- Chung Cheng High School (Main)
- Goodman Arts Centre (former LASALLE College of the Arts)

=== Shopping Centres ===
- Katong Shopping Centre

== Points of interest ==
- Katong Community Centre (formally Mountbatten CC)
- Singapore Sindhi Association

== Notable places ==
- 733 Mountbatten Road
- Sing Hoe Hotel (formerly Sin Hoe)

== Politics ==
The Mountbatten area was under the electoral district of both Mountbatten Single Member Constituency and the neighbouring Marine Parade-Braddell Heights Group Representation Constituency. The namesake SMC covers most of the western areas, Tanjong Rhu and Marina East, while the remainder covers the GRC. Mountbatten was part of the Marine Parade Group Representation Constituency (which has since been renamed to Marine Parade-Braddell Heights in 2025) between 1997 and 2011, where the constituency experienced a walkover during that period; since 2011, Mountbatten returned to being an SMC and both wards become contested for the first time since 1991, where Mountbatten faced an electoral contest since then, alongside Marine Parade (except in 2025).

== Transportation ==
Mountbatten is served by Mountbatten MRT station and Dakota MRT station on the Circle MRT line. Both stations are situated beneath Old Airport Road.

== Gallery ==
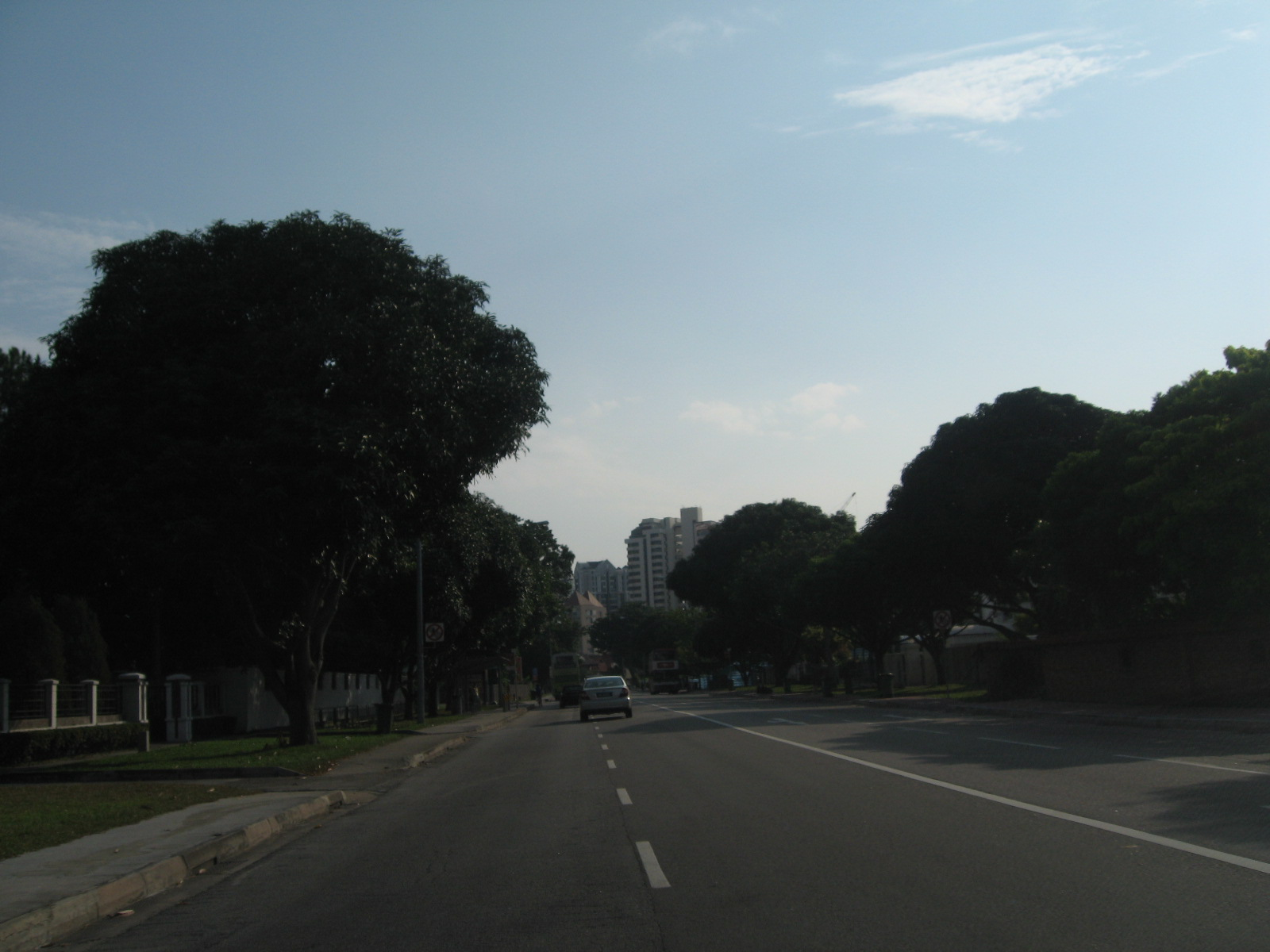
A view of Mountbatten Road in Singapore

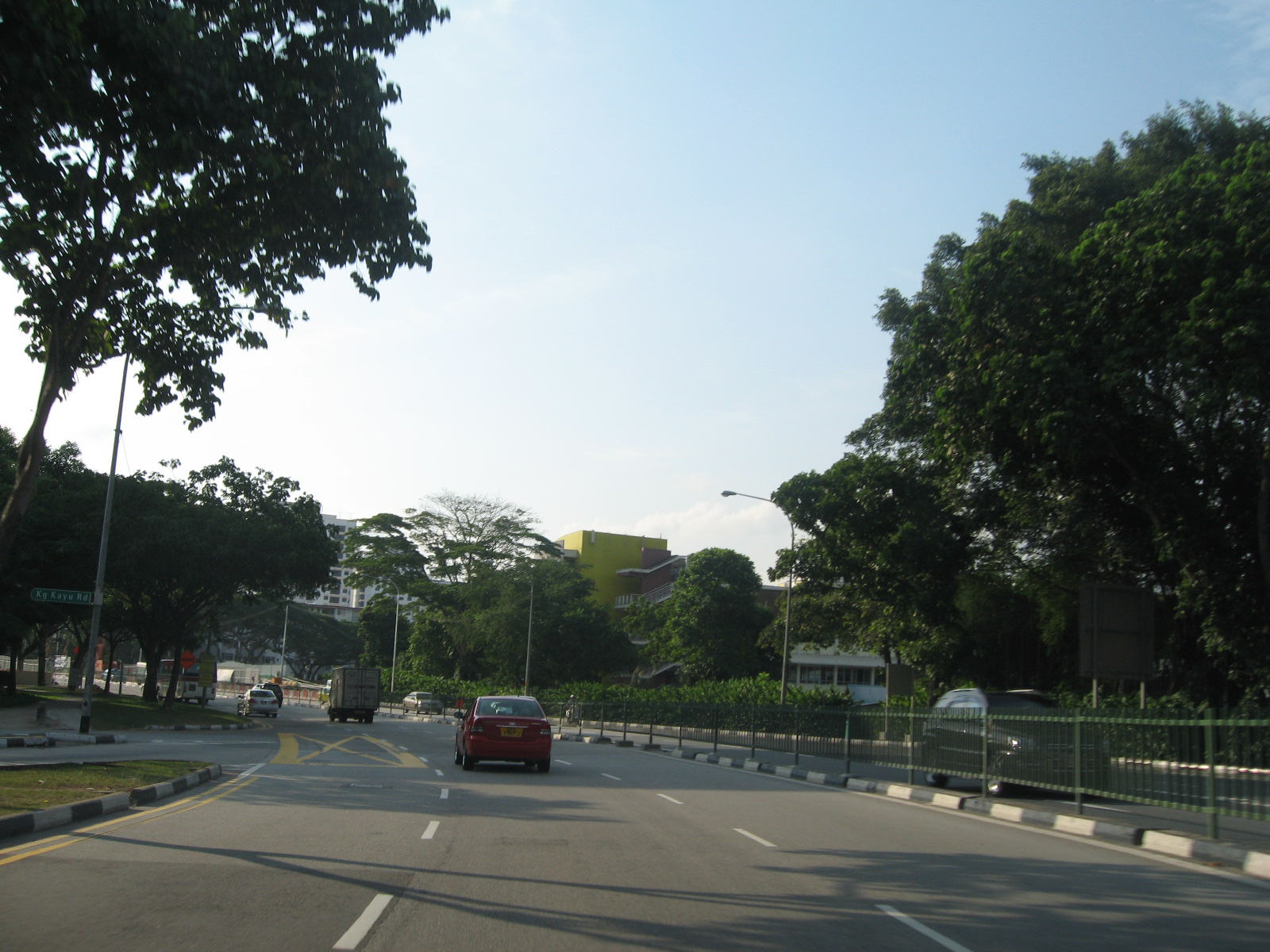
A view of Mountbatten Road in Singapore

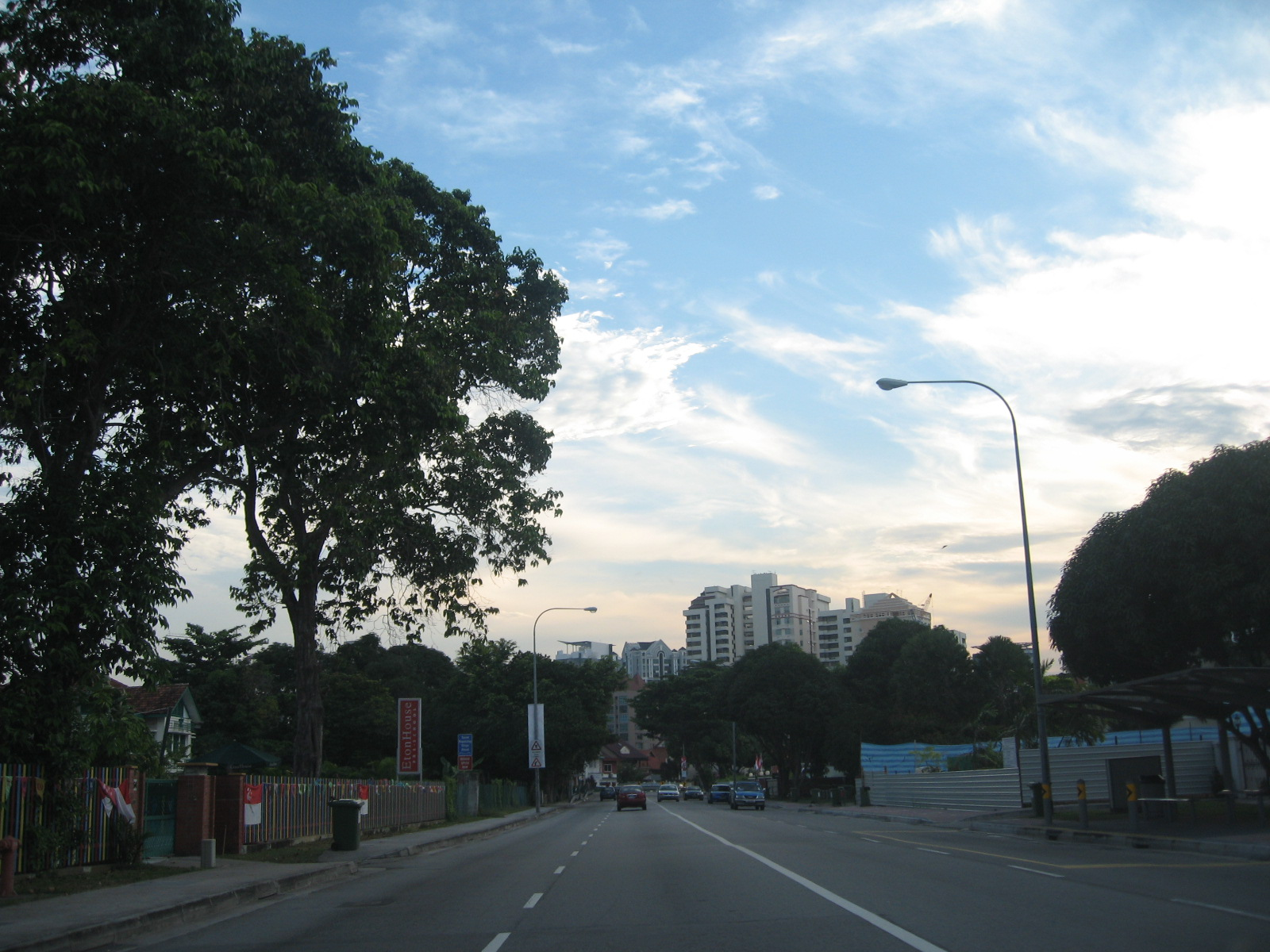
A view of Mountbatten Road in Singapore

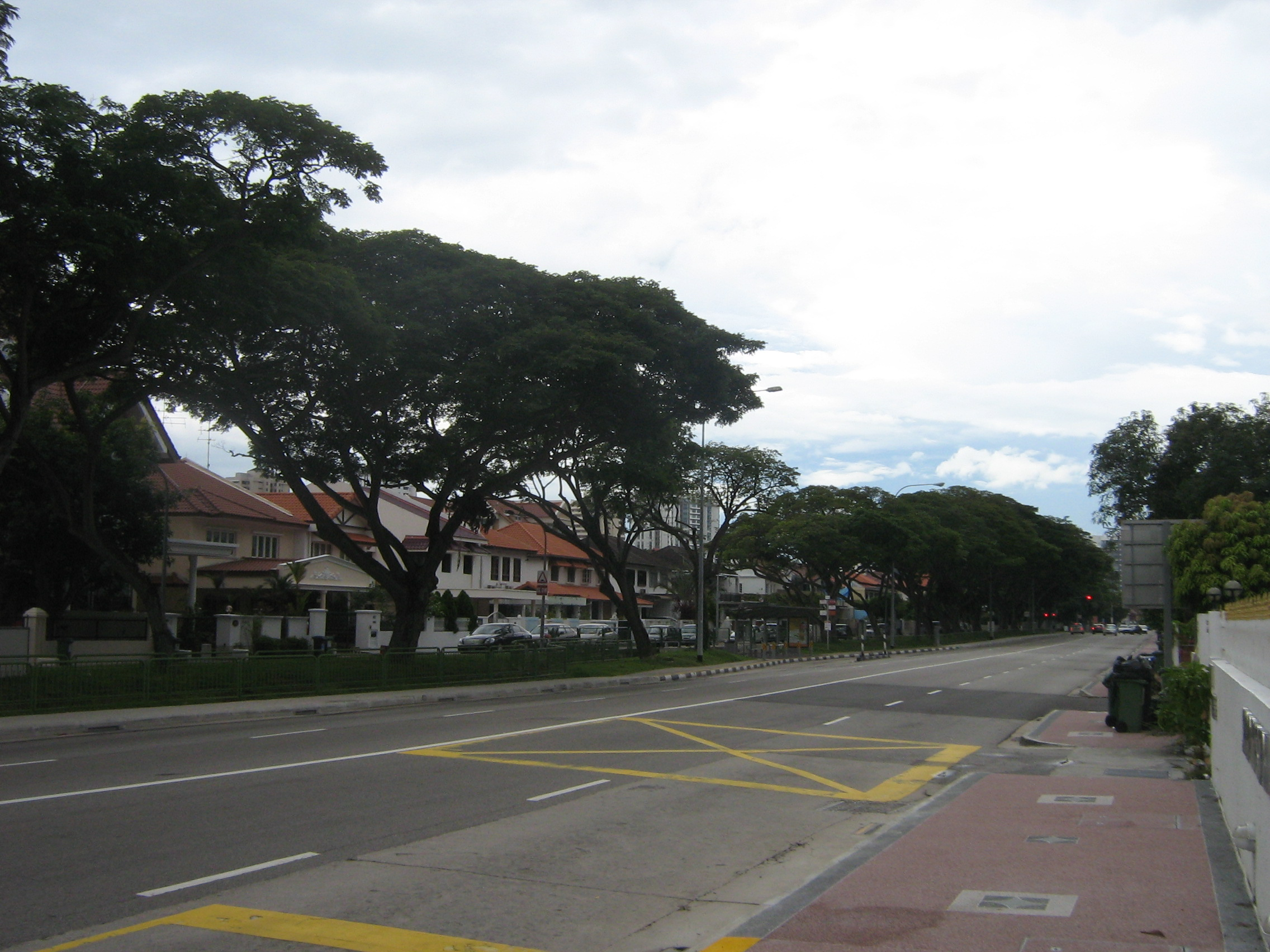
A view of Mountbatten Road in Singapore

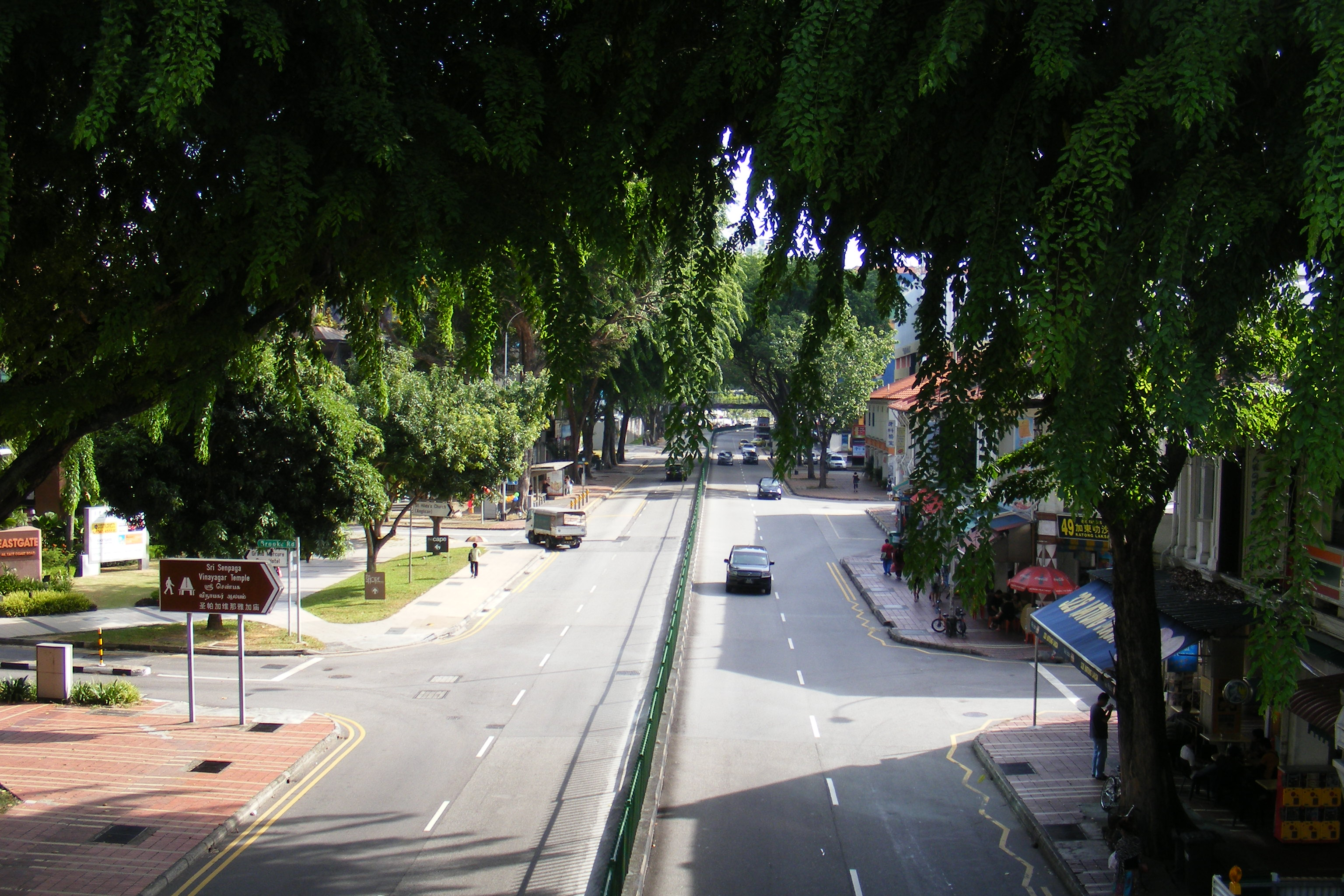
A view of Mountbatten Road in Singapore

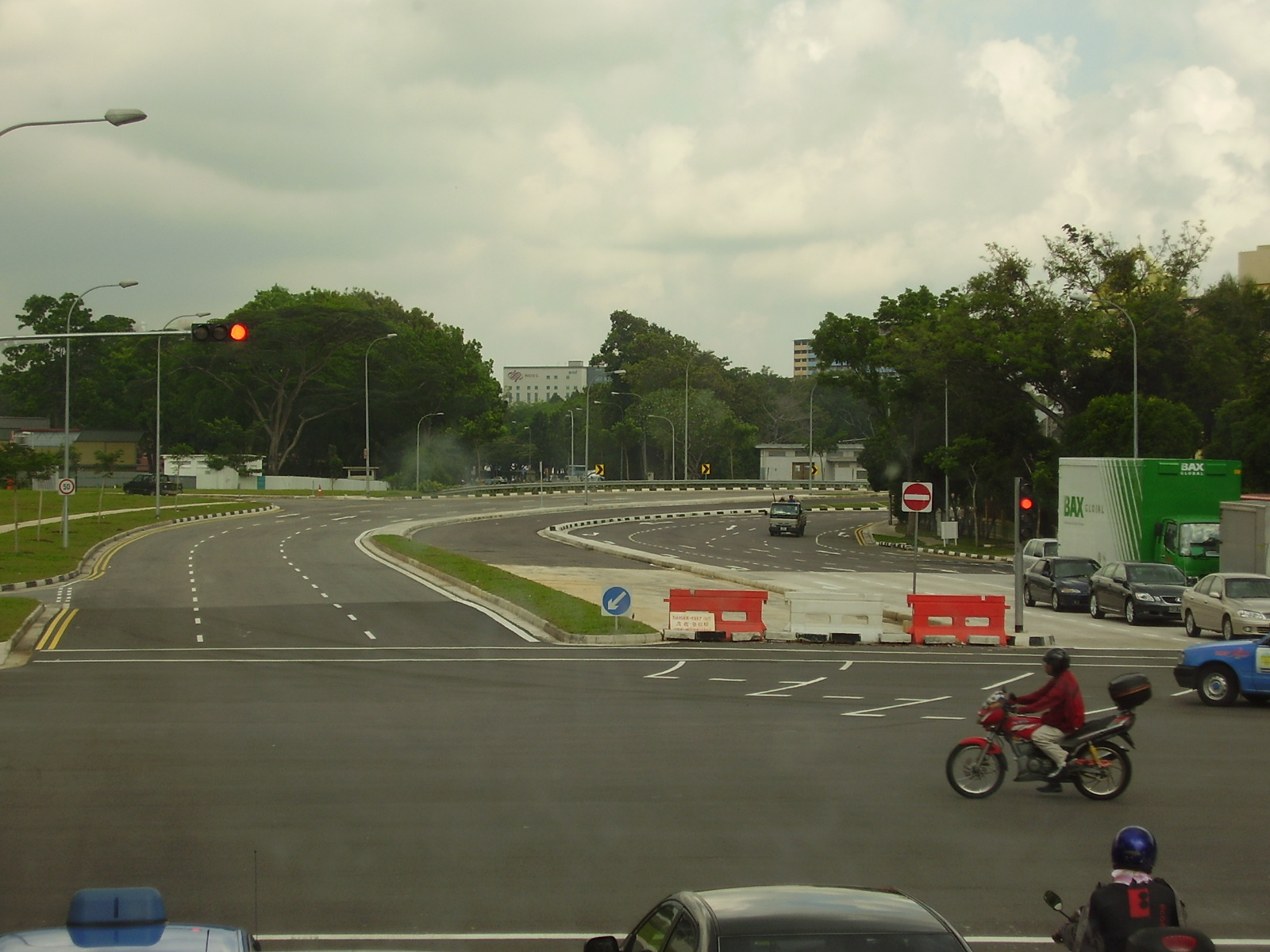
The junction of Mountbatten Road, Nicoll Highway, Sims Way and Guillemard Road.
