= Mountbatten MRT station =

Mass Rapid Transit station in Singapore

Mountbatten CC7 蒙巴登 மவுண்ட்பேட்டன்
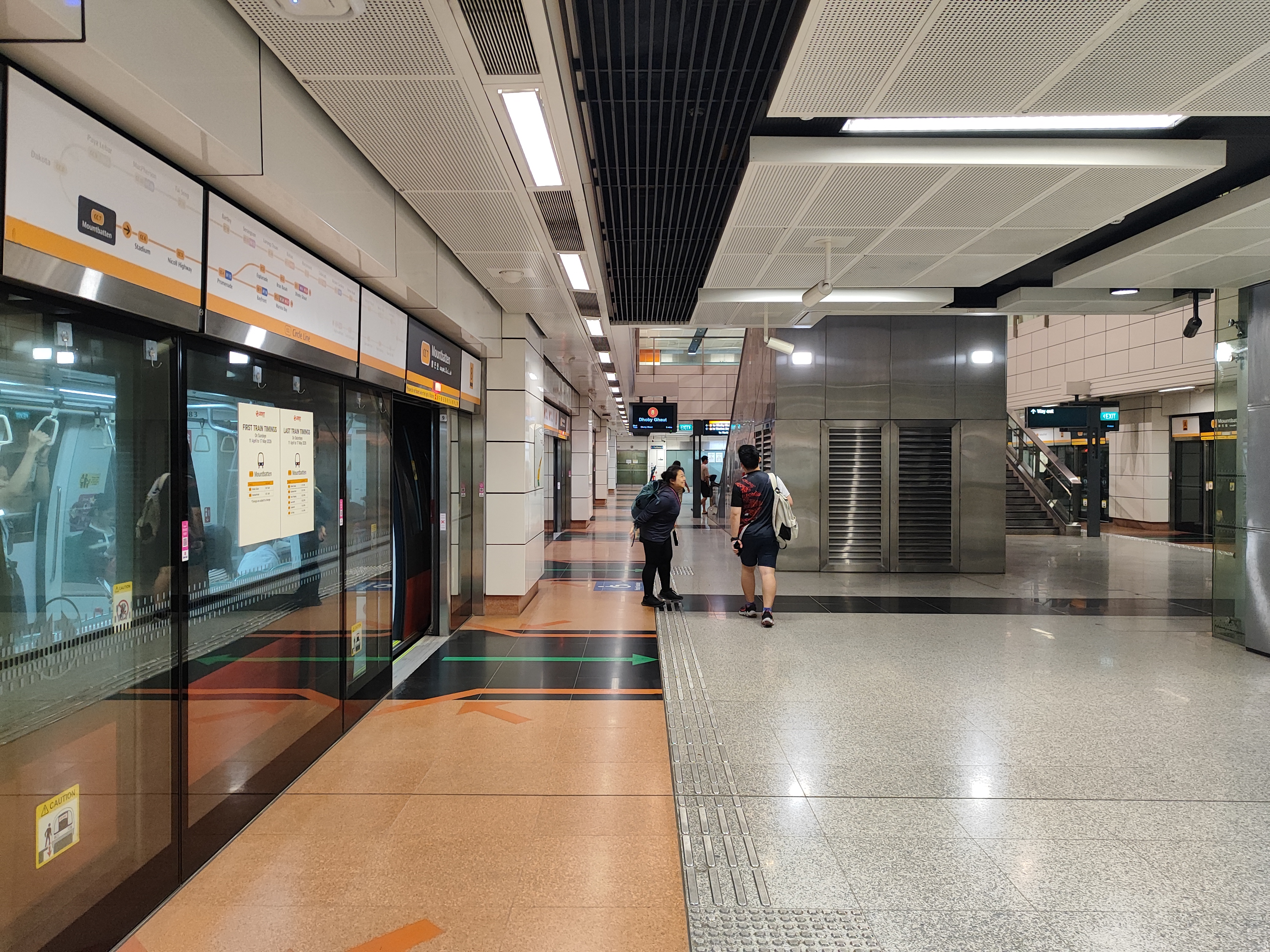
- Platform level of Mountbatten MRT station.

General information
- Location: 301 Mountbatten Road, Singapore 398006
- Coordinates: 01°18′23″N 103°52′57″E
- System: Mass Rapid Transit (MRT) station
- Owner: Land Transport Authority
- Operator: SMRT Trains
- Line: Circle Line
- Platforms: 2 (1 island platform)
- Tracks: 2
- Connections: Bus

Construction
- Structure type: Underground
- Platform levels: 1
- Cycle facilities: Yes
- Accessible: Yes

History
- Opened: 17 April 2010; 16 years ago
- Former names: Old Airport Road

Passengers
- June 2024: 6,316 per day

Services
Preceding station	Mass Rapid Transit	Following station
Stadium Clockwise	Circle Line	Dakota Anticlockwise
Stadium towards Dhoby Ghaut	Circle Line	Dakota towards Prince Edward Road
Track layout
Location
- Location within Singapore Rail central area

Mountbatten MRT station is an underground Mass Rapid Transit (MRT) station on the Circle Line (CCL) in Kallang, Singapore. Located near Mountbatten Road, the station serves nearby landmarks such as the Kallang Field and Goodman Arts Centre. A public artwork entitled Lord Mountbatten Thinks of Pink, which consists of two pink-tinted panels displaying a calm ocean landscape and a ship travelling in the evening, is displayed at this station as part of the Art in Transit programme.

The station was announced in April 2001 as part of Stage 2 of the CCL as Old Airport Road station. Construction of the station was halted by the Land Transport Authority (LTA) following the Nicoll Highway collapse in April 2004, but was resumed two months later. The station was renamed to Mountbatten station in July 2005 after Lord Mountbatten. Mountbatten station, along with other CCL stations from Dhoby Ghaut to Tai Seng, opened on 17 April 2010.

== History ==
In November 1999, the Land Transport Authority (LTA) announced that it would extend the Marina Line, a planned rail line, from Stadium Boulevard station to connect to the Outer Circle Line at Paya Lebar. The two lines were merged in April 2001 to create the 34 km (21 mi) Circle Line (CCL); the second phase of the CCL involved a 5 km (3.1 mi) extension from Stadium Boulevard to Upper Paya Lebar Road with five stations, including Old Airport Road station. Named after the Old Airport Road area in Tanjong Katong, the station was expected to be completed in 2006.

Construction of the CCL began in March 2002. The contract to build the Old Airport Road station was awarded to a joint venture between Nishimatsu and Lum Chang for S$332 million (US$185.41 million) in August. However, the Nicoll Highway collapse on 20 April 2004 delayed operations for Stage 2 CCL stations to 2009. The LTA halted work at Old Airport Road station along with other stations under Nishimatsu to review their sites. By June 2004, the Building and Construction Authority approved the resumption of construction at Old Airport Road station; as the construction site had soft marine clay similar to the Nicoll Highway site, additional struts and other support structures were required to be installed.

Following a public poll, in July 2005, the LTA renamed Old Airport Road station to Mountbatten after the British naval commander Lord Mountbatten, who is also the namesake of Mountbatten Road. In August 2009, transport minister Raymond Lim announced that Mountbatten, along with stations from Dhoby Ghaut to Tai Seng, would open by the first half of 2010; the date was later announced as 17 April. As announced in March, an open house was held at Mountbatten and other stations in the Dhoby Ghaut–Tai Seng stretch by the LTA on 4 April 2010. The station opened on 17 April 2010 along with the aforementioned CCL stations.

== Details ==
Mountbatten station serves the CCL and is between Dakota and Stadium stations, with the official station code of CC7. Under the New Rail Financing Framework, it is owned by the Land Transport Authority. As part of the CCL, the station is operated by SMRT Trains. The station operates between 5:35 am and 12:22 am daily. Train frequencies vary from 3.5 to an average of 5 minutes during peak hours to an average of 6 minutes for off-peak hours.

The station – located between the planning areas of Kallang and Geylang in the Central Region of Singapore – is on the junction of Old Airport Road, Stadium Boulevard, and Mountbatten Road. It serves various nearby landmarks such as the Goodman Arts Centre, Kallang Field, and Kallang Tennis Centre. Mountbatten station is wheelchair accessible and also has bicycle facilities.

Like other CCL stage 1–5 stations, Mountbatten was designed to have a "high-tech" architecture such that it would "not go out of style" in the future, according to the writer Colin Cheong. A tactile system of tiles with rounded or elongated raised studs guides visually impaired commuters through the station, with dedicated tactile routes that connect the station entrances to the platforms. Wider fare gates allow easier access for wheelchair users into the station.

As part of the Art in Transit programme, a showcase of public artworks on the MRT, Lord Mountbatten Thinks of Pink by Jason Wee is displayed at Mountbatten station. Lord Mountbatten Thinks of Pink is located at the corridor to Exit B and consists of two pink-tinted panels – one of them depicts a calm ocean landscape during dawn, while the other illustrates a blurred container ship sailing in the evening. Wee took inspiration from Mountbatten pink, a shade of pink promoted as a camouflage for ships by Lord Mountbatten. Wee intended the artwork to illustrate what Mountbatten was thinking of when conceptualising the idea of Mountbatten pink, but also wanted the artwork's pink to represent Mountbatten's lifestyle. He stated "I hope [commuters] get the humour. I hope they understand I'm paying homage to someone but I'm also making fun of the person". Writing for Today in 2010, Mayo Martin stated that Lord Mountbatten Thinks of Pink was the "most ingenuous" of the artworks on the CCL. However, he also commented that "... we think it's the kind of artwork that really needs a bench in front of it. We honestly thought it was a very creative tourism ad without the logo."
