= Dakota MRT station =

MRT station in Geylang, Singapore

Dakota CC8 达科达 டகோட்டா
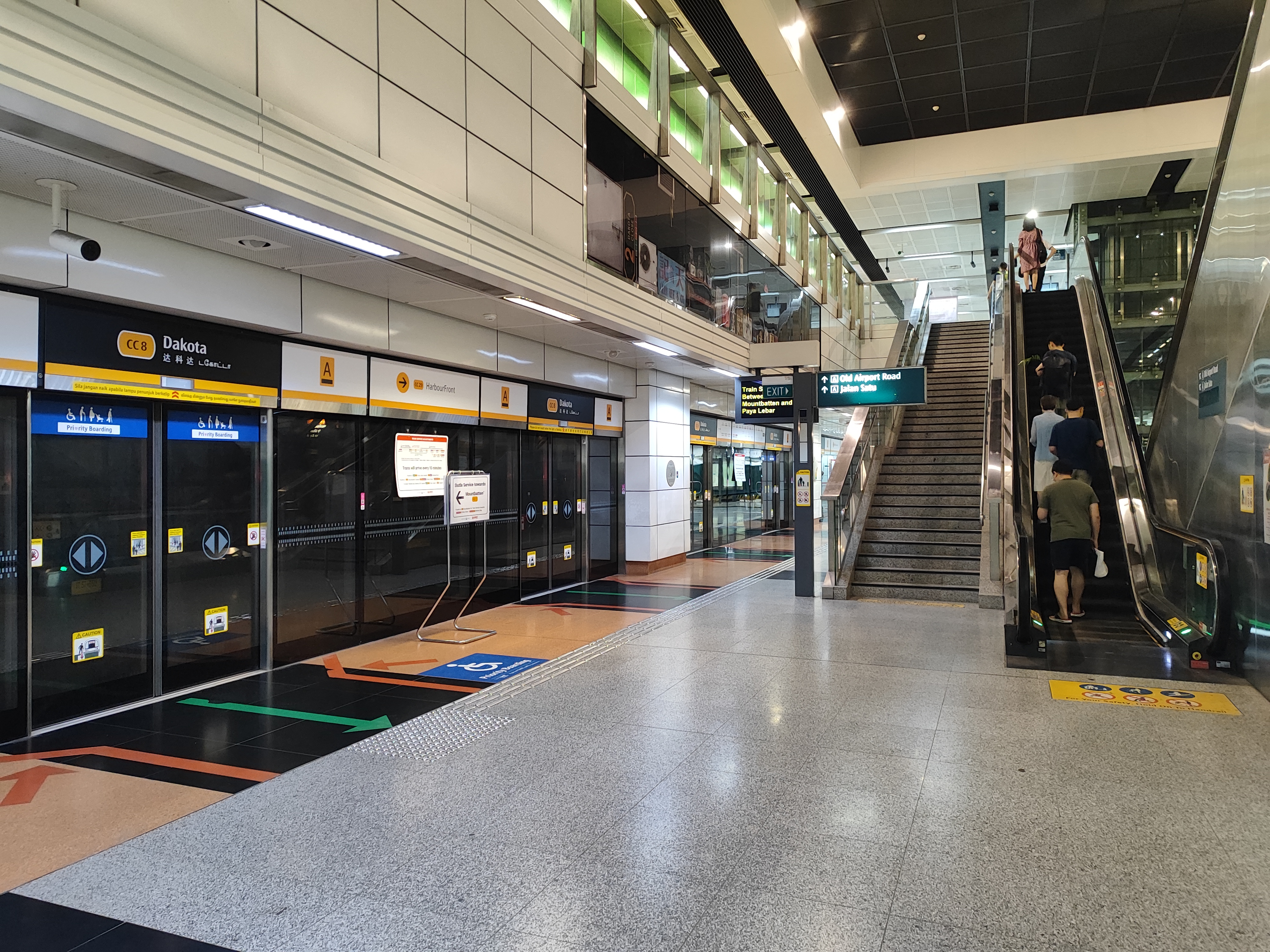
- Platform A of Dakota station

General information
- Location: 211 Old Airport Road, Singapore 397971
- Coordinates: 01°18′30″N 103°53′19″E
- System: Mass Rapid Transit (MRT) station
- Owner: Land Transport Authority
- Operator: SMRT Trains
- Line: Circle Line
- Platforms: 2 (1 island platform)
- Tracks: 2
- Connections: Bus, Taxi

Construction
- Structure type: Underground
- Platform levels: 1
- Cycle facilities: Yes
- Accessible: Yes

History
- Opened: 17 April 2010; 16 years ago
- Former names: Tanjong Katong

Passengers
- June 2024: 7,870 per day

Services
Preceding station	Mass Rapid Transit	Following station
Mountbatten Clockwise	Circle Line	Paya Lebar Anticlockwise
Mountbatten towards Dhoby Ghaut	Circle Line	Paya Lebar towards Prince Edward Road
Track layout
Location
- Location within Singapore Rail central area

Dakota MRT station is an underground Mass Rapid Transit (MRT) station on the Circle Line (CCL) in Geylang, Singapore. Operated by SMRT Trains, it serves nearby landmarks such as the Dakota Crescent housing estate, Broadrick Secondary School, Kong Hwa School, and Old Airport Food Court & Shopping Mall. The photographic collection Little Things, Little Stories by art group A Dose of Light, which features photographs of objects found in the Dakota neighbourhood, is displayed at this station as part of the Art-in-Transit artwork programme.

The station was first announced in April 2001 under the name Tanjong Katong as part of Stage 2 of the CCL. It had to be rebuilt when construction resumed in June 2004, following the Nicoll Highway collapse in April. It was renamed to Dakota in July 2005 and opened on 17 April 2010 alongside other CCL stations from Dhoby Ghaut to Tai Seng.

== History ==
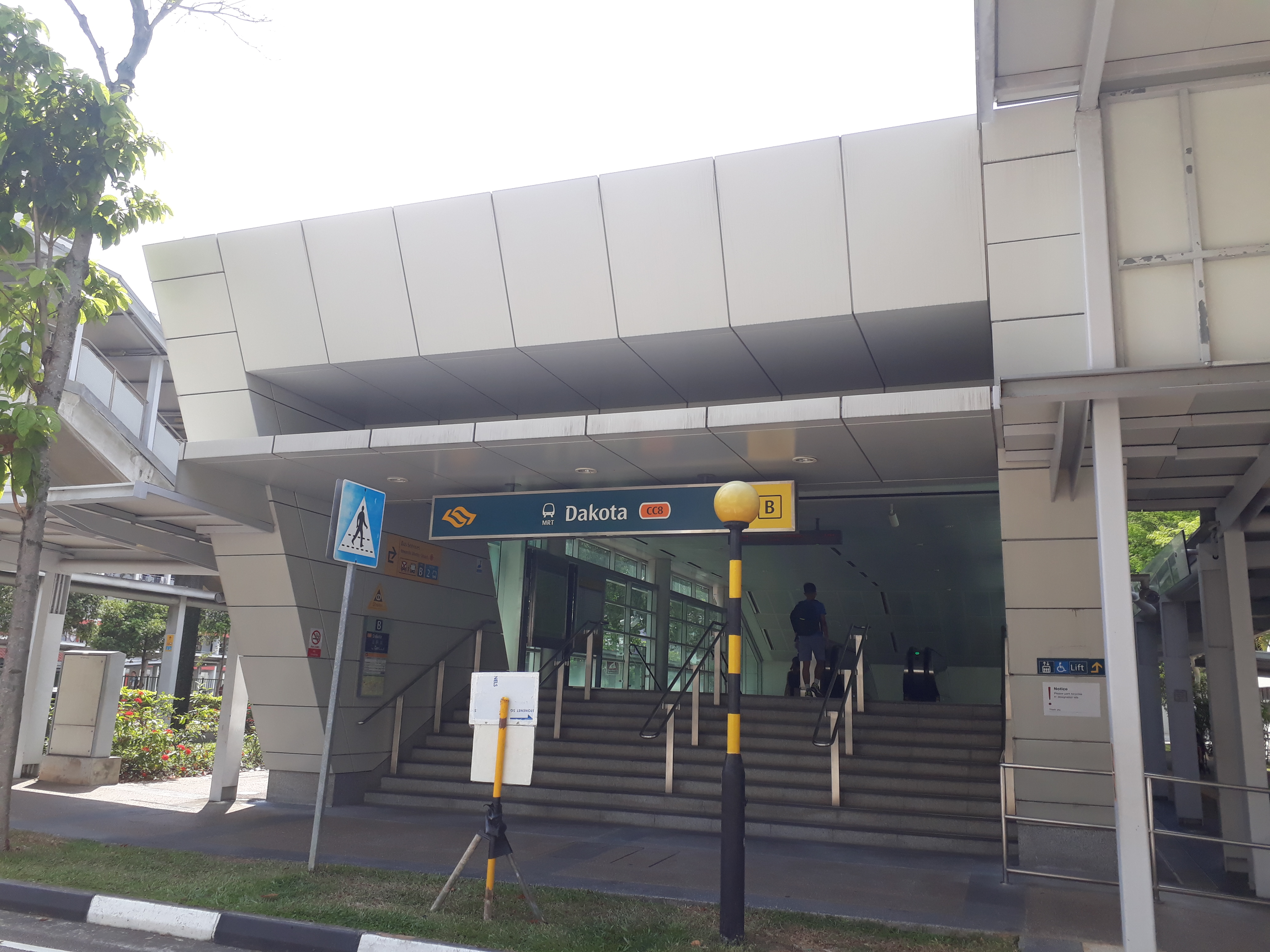
Exit B of Dakota MRT station in July 2019.

In November 1999, the Land Transport Authority (LTA) announced that it would extend the Marina Line, a planned rail line, from the then-Stadium Boulevard station to connect to the Outer Circle Line at Paya Lebar. The lines were merged to create the Circle Line (CCL) in April 2001; the second phase of the CCL involved a 5 km (3.1 mi) extension from Stadium Boulevard to Upper Paya Lebar Road with 5 stations.

The CCL contract for the then-Tanjong Katong station was awarded to a joint venture between Nishimatsu and Lum Chang for S$322 million (US$179.83 million) in August 2002. However, after the Nicoll Highway collapse on 20 April 2004, the opening of the CCL was set as 2009. The LTA halted work at stations under the joint venture to review their sites. In June 2004, the Building and Construction Authority approved the resumption of construction at Tanjong Katong station; however, it required the installation of additional struts and other support structures due to the soft marine clay at the site. The station, which was partially excavated, was also filled and rebuilt.

Following a public poll, the LTA renamed Tanjong Katong station to Dakota in July 2005. As part of the station's construction, a section of Old Airport Road was closed from March 2006; by then, the station was expected to be completed by 2010. However, Christopher Tan of The Straits Times reported in November 2007 that Dakota's construction was "lagging behind" compared to other CCL stations. The closed section of Old Airport Road reopened in December 2008 but caused a nearby road to be permanently closed.

In August 2009, Dakota station was expected to receive its Temporary Occupation Permit by the end of the year. In the same month, transport minister Raymond Lim announced that it, along with other stations from Dhoby Ghaut to Tai Seng, would open by the first half of 2010; the date was later announced to be 17 April. As announced in March, an open house was held at stations in the Dhoby Ghaut–Tai Seng stretch by the LTA on 4 April 2010. They opened on 17 April 2010.

== Details ==
Dakota station serves the CCL. It is between Mountbatten and Paya Lebar stations and has the official station code of CC8. As part of the CCL, the station is operated by SMRT Trains. It operates between 5:37 am and 12:23 am daily. Train frequencies vary between 3.5 and 5 minutes during peak hours and have an average of 6 minutes during off-peak hours. The station is wheelchair-accessible. A tactile system, consisting of tiles with rounded or elongated raised studs, guides visually impaired commuters through the station, with dedicated tactile routes that connect the station entrances to the platforms. Wider fare gates allow wheelchair users to enter the station more easily. The station also has bicycle facilities. It runs along Old Airport Road, and serves various nearby landmarks such as Broadrick Secondary School, Kong Hwa School, Mountbatten Neighbourhood Police Post, and Old Airport Food Court & Shopping Mall.

=== Art-in-Transit ===
As part of the Art-in-Transit programme, which showcases public artworks on the MRT, Little Things, Little Stories, an artwork by art group A Dose of Light, is displayed at Dakota station. It consists of approximately 70 photographs of objects found in the Dakota neighbourhood, such as kueh moulds, a lift door, and plastic chairs used in kopitiams, among other objects. It also features a sculpture of a man, based on buskers in nearby food centres, inside a mailbox, and a television set featuring the photographers and artists of the artwork, Zhao Renhui and Ang Song Nian, as newscasters. When interviewed by the LTA, Ang said that the inclusion of the television was for "posterity's sake". He also said that the 1:1 ratio of the objects displayed "retains the integrity of the selected items which we believe would best showcase and illustrate the characteristics of the Dakota neighbourhood". According to the LTA, the photographers intended to create a "visual time capsule" as they were afraid that the aforementioned objects would disappear amidst major developments following the opening of the station.

Little Things, Little Stories was one of six artworks that won a competition organised by the LTA to install artworks for CCL stations. Over the course of a year, Zhao and Ang visited Dakota 48 times; they would conduct their visits when Zhao, who was studying abroad, returned to Singapore. When visiting Dakota for the first time, the two envisioned the artwork's concept after seeing various objects that evoked a "sense of nostalgia", such as floor tiles, pay phones, and footwear. The photographers initially photographed objects in the area, such as signage and potted plants; residents often mistook them to be government agents conducting inspections, with Zhao adding that when the duo persuaded private property residents to allow them to enter, "people were very wary of us, so that was very tough". The photographers discovered more "interesting" objects once they entered residents' homes, prompting them to include those objects in their artwork. Inspired by a resident who arranged her fridge magnets in a similar manner, the photographers attempted to compile their hundreds of photographs into the artwork. However, they instead selected the objects they considered most interesting for the final artwork after the initial artwork's layout was messy and the canvas proved too small to fit all the images.
