= The Verge, Singapore =

Defunct shopping mall in Singapore

The Verge
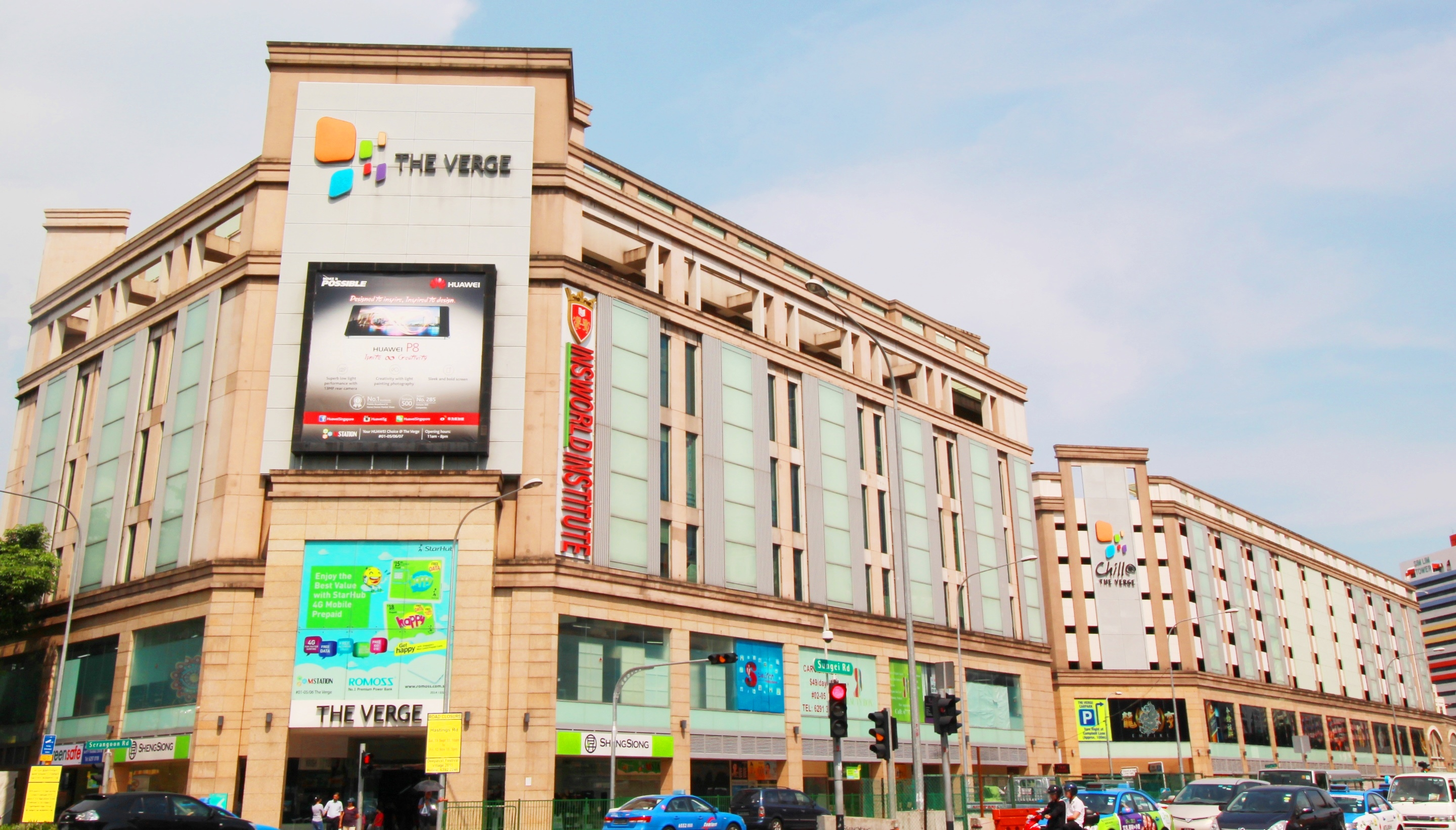
- The Verge

- Location within Singapore
- Former names: Tekka Mall

General information
- Status: Demolished
- Location: Little India, Singapore, 2 Serangoon Road, Singapore 218227, Singapore
- Coordinates: 1°18′18.4″N 103°51′05.0″E
- Opened: 2003; 23 years ago
- Closed: July 2017; 9 years ago
- Demolished: September 2017; 8 years ago
- Client: UEMS Solutions Pte Ltd
- Owner: DRB-HICOM

Technical details
- Floor count: 8
- Floor area: 238,527 square feet (22,159.9 m^{2})

Design and construction
- Architecture firm: L&L Consultants
- Known for: First shopping mall in Little India, Singapore

Other information
- Number of stores: 50
- Number of anchors: 1

Website
- theverge.com.sg

The Verge, formerly Tekka Mall (Chinese: 德卡廊), was the first and largest modern shopping mall at the Little India precinct in Singapore. It was opened in 2003. The Verge had two buildings, the main building and Chill @ The Verge. It was located in the southern part of Little India, with the main building located at the junction of Serangoon Road and Sungei Road and the Chill @ The Verge at the junction of Perak Road and Sungei Road. Both of the buildings were separated by Clive Street and the mall lies opposite of Tekka Centre across Serangoon Road. The complex was demolished in 2017 to make way for redevelopment after 14 years of operation, making it one of the youngest malls in Singapore to shut its doors.

== History ==
In 1915, Kandang Kerbau Market at the junction of Serangoon Road and Rochor Road was built by the Municipal Commission at the cost of S$107,690 on the original site of Tekka Mall. Back then, it was one of the more popular markets in Singapore because its stalls offered the best cuts of beef and mutton due to the market's proximity to the cattle ranches in the area. However, by the early 1950s, the market became overcrowded and congested, and there was a pressing need for the market to undergo upgrading works.

Originally called Kandang Kerbau (KK), meaning “buffalo pens” in Malay, the market is actually referred to the cattle slaughtering houses at Serangoon in the early 20th century. Its name was later changed to Tekka Pasar (笛卡巴刹), a unique combination in a name that made up of Chinese dialect and Malay, similar to that of “kopitiam”. Tekka means “the foot of the bamboo” in Hokkien while Pasar is “market” in Malay. In the seventies, there were many makeshift stalls lined up along Serangoon Road outside Tekka Market. The bustling place, selling almost all sort of basic necessities, was extremely popular among the housewives, and attracted a large mixture of Chinese, Malay and Indian customers.

In 1982, the Old Tekka Market was torn down to make way for the construction and widening of nearby roads. All the stallholders were relocated to the new double-storey Tekka Market, also known as Buffalo Road Market, situated opposite the former old market. The new building, which houses a wet market, a hawker centre and rows of retailer shops, continues to demonstrate the multicultural cohesiveness and harmonious relationship between the local races of Chinese, Malay and Indian.

In 2003, Little India, Singapore's first air-conditioned mall was built on the site of the old Kandang Kerbau Market, which made way for the construction of Tekka Mall.

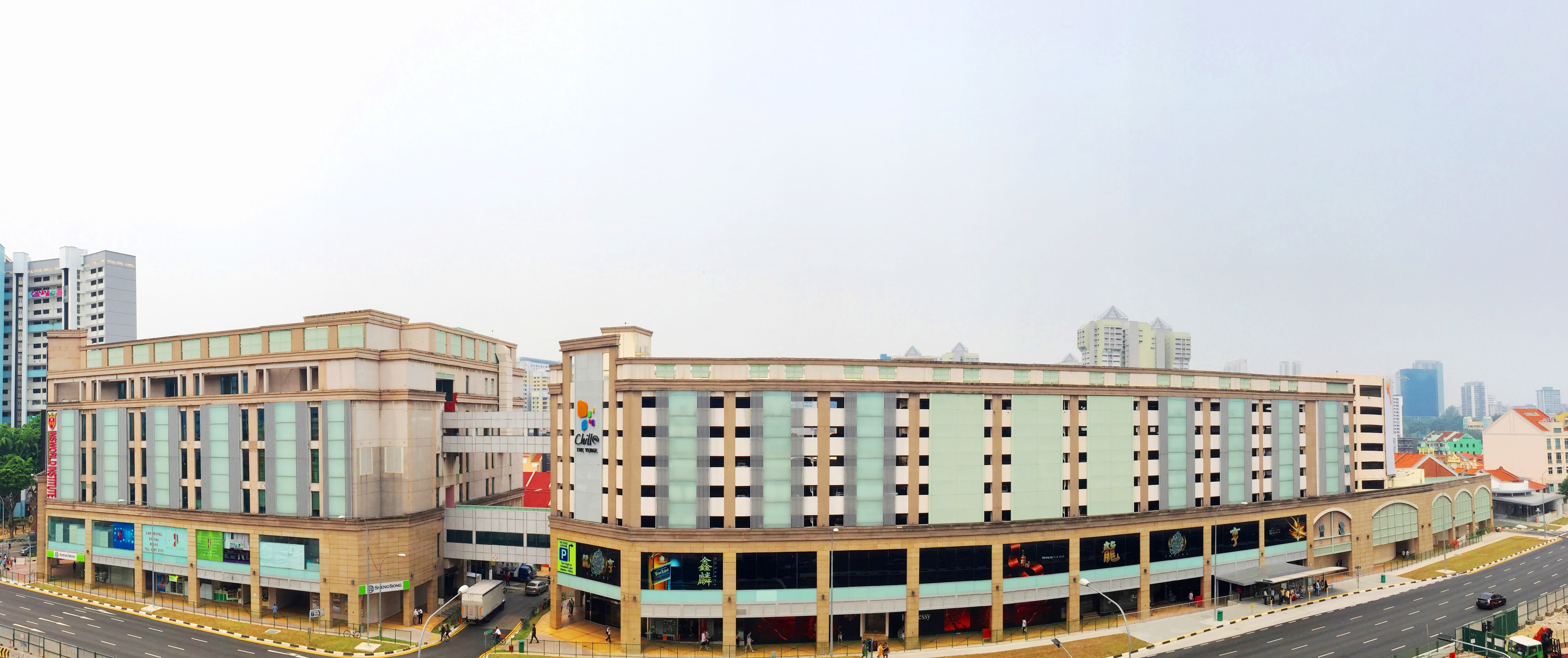
Panorama of The Verge and Chill @ The Verge

=== Makeover ===
Despite being the first shopping mall in Little India, many tenants had a hard time doing business in the mall, with a number of them closing down their outlet. To improve this situation, Tekka Mall was refurbished to give it a more contemporary and brighter feel, with the mall also being renamed to The Verge. It was also transformed into an IT, lifestyle and F&B hub. On 16 July 2008, the mall was revamped, which also brought about the name change from Tekka Mall to The Verge. The adjoining block underwent a makeover to target the youth, being renamed to Chill @ The Verge. The makeover was completed in 2009. Discussions were underway to secure a number of electronics outlets.

=== Facilities ===
The ground floor houses ethnic Indian wear, F&B outlets and services. The fifth floor houses a collection of craft and florist shops. The retail shops are complemented with service providers. The mix of tenants ensures that there is something for everyone at The Verge. The Verge has undergone major improvement in 2014 to improve the traffic flow and accommodate the growing number of shoppers. The mall has now added a greater variety of food and beverage options for shoppers, which serve local favourites. The Verge is popular with families, youth and has household retail brands as tenants. There used to be a departmental store known as Shop-In on one of the top floors.

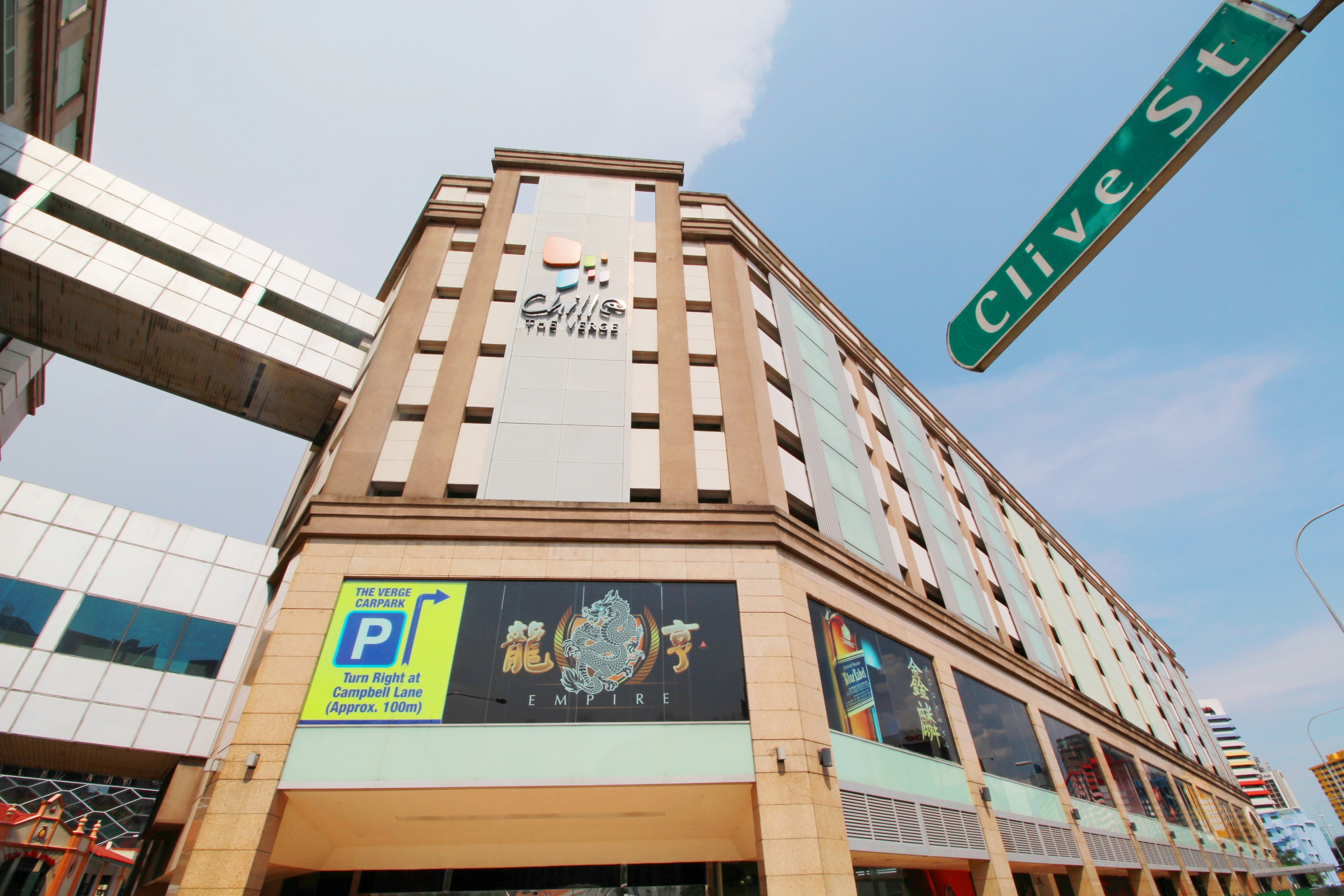
Chill @ The Verge, Little India, Singapore

=== Main Building ===
Although it is considered the main building, it is about half the size of the Chill @ The Verge. Before the makeover, tenants in the main building were mainly thrift shops, ranging from jewellery to household items to clothing. A food court and a furniture store also opened at The Verge. There were also some food outlets, a music school, a betting outlet, some travel agencies, a department store, a fresh market and a money changer. There was once a Burger King outlet at basement 1 but it has closed down due to lack of business. After the makeover, most of the shops are new tenants. Sheng Siong hypermarket occupied the two basement levels of the mall, and a loading bay at the ground level.

=== Chill @ The Verge ===
Bigger than the main building, the Chill @ The Verge was once occupied by Sheng Siong before it moved its operations to the Main Building. Chill @ The Verge is largely occupied by nightclub entertainment, a tattoo shop on the ground level and parking facilities on levels 3 to 7. The new Rochor MRT station has an exit located next to Chill @ The Verge.

=== Link Bridges ===
One can walk between the main building and Chill @ The Verge either by crossing the road that separates the two buildings or use any of the three link bridges located on levels 2, 3, 5 and 6 of both buildings.

=== Demolition ===
In July 2017, The Verge was officially closed to the public and the main block was demolished in September. However, the annex block (Chill @ The Verge) is conserved and plans for refurbishment are underway.

== New Development ==
On 13 August 2018, Tekka Place has its name and branding unveiled as the upcoming integrated development along Serangoon Road.

Jointly developed by Lum Chang Holdings and a fund managed by LaSalle Investment Management Asia, it will have an emphasis on the arts and culture, with dedicated spaces to host exhibitions, artwork and performances. Its developers have been engaging with the Singapore Tourism Board and community stakeholders such as the Indian Heritage Centre and LaSalle College of the Arts.

Tekka Place, which is being built on the site of the former The Verge mall, will comprise a 10-storey main block and seven-storey annex block with rooftop deck.

The upper floors of the main block will house Citadines Rochor, a 320-unit serviced residence with studio and one-bedroom units. Facilities include a lounge, gymnasium, launderette and swimming pool.

The development will also include 70,000 sq ft of retail area, and five levels of parking spaces. The retail podium will have 80 shops spread across the basement and first two floors of the main block. It will cater to residents in the southern central part of Singapore, office workers in the immediate vicinity, tourists and commuters on the North East line and Downtown line.

Knight Frank has been appointed retail consultant and marketing agent for Tekka Place. The integrated development is currently undergoing construction and is slated for completion in the later part of 2019.

Therefore, Tekka Place has officially opened its doors on 9 March 2020.

== Transportation ==
Situated on a corner site with high visibility along two major roads within the popular tourist district of Little India, Singapore, the building is served by local bus routes and connections to major cross-island expressways by Mass Rapid Transit (MRT) from Little India on the North East line and Downtown line, Rochor, Jalan Besar and Bugis on the Downtown line and East West line and by several major roads - Bukit Timah Road, Sungei Road, Rochor Canal Road, Selegie Road and Serangoon Road lead to The Verge.

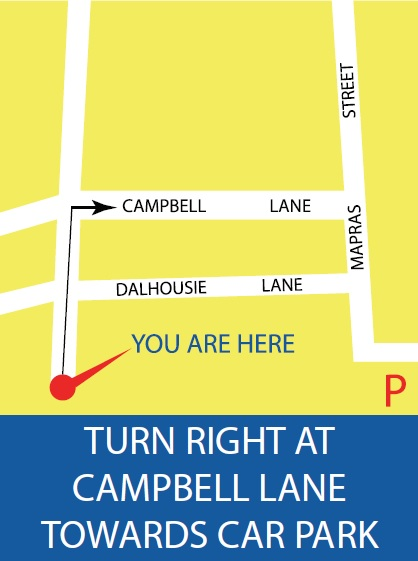
Directions to The Verge Car Park from Clive Street and Madras Street

== See also ==
- List of shopping malls in Singapore
- Little India
- Tekka Market
- Serangoon Road
- Sungei Road
