= Little India MRT station =

Mass Rapid Transit station in Singapore

Little India NE7 DT12 小印度 லிட்டில் இந்தியா
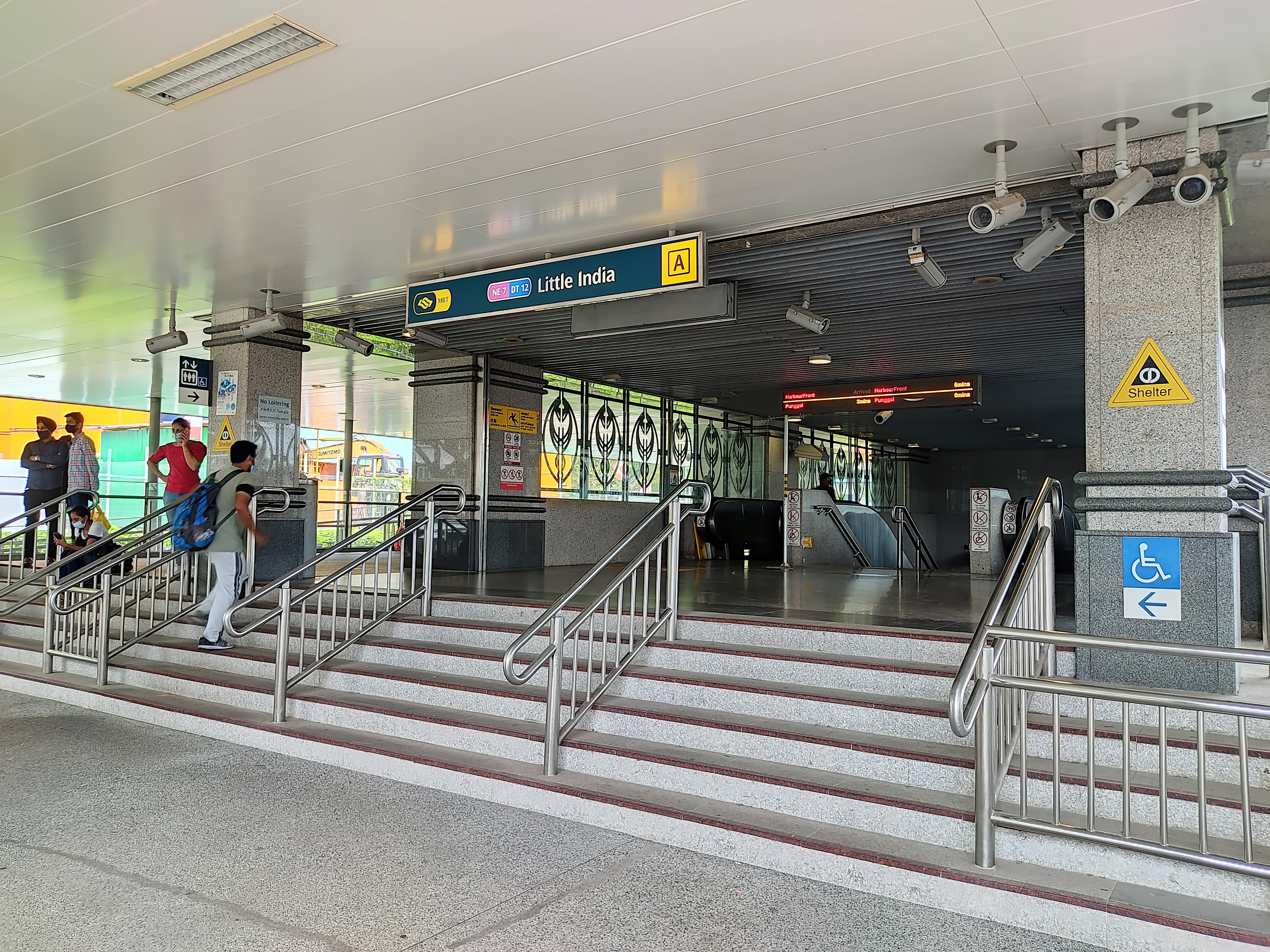
- Exit A of Little India station

General information
- Location: 60 Bukit Timah Road, Singapore 229900 (NEL); 62 Bukit Timah Road, Singapore 229902 (DTL)
- Coordinates: 01°18′24″N 103°50′59″E
- System: Mass Rapid Transit (MRT) interchange
- Owner: Land Transport Authority
- Operator: SBS Transit
- Line: North East Line Downtown Line
- Platforms: 4 (2 island platforms)
- Tracks: 4
- Connections: Bus, Taxi

Construction
- Structure type: Underground
- Platform levels: 2
- Parking: Yes (KK Women's and Children's Hospital, Tekka Centre)
- Accessible: Yes

Other information
- Station code: LTI

History
- Opened: 20 June 2003; 23 years ago (North East Line); 27 December 2015; 10 years ago (Downtown Line)
- Former names: Kandang Kerbau

Passengers
- June 2024: 27,711 per day

Services
Preceding station	Mass Rapid Transit	Following station
Dhoby Ghaut towards HarbourFront	North East Line	Farrer Park towards Punggol Coast
Newton towards Bukit Panjang	Downtown Line	Rochor towards Expo
Track layout
Location
- Location within Singapore Rail central area

Little India MRT station is an underground Mass Rapid Transit (MRT) interchange station on the North East (NEL) and Downtown (DTL) lines. The station is located at the junction of Bukit Timah Road and Race Course Road, and serves the ethnic neighbourhood of Little India. Several landmarks surrounding the station include KK Women's and Children's Hospital, Tekka Market, and the Land Transport Authority headquarters.

First announced as Kandang Kerbau MRT station in 1996, the construction required the use of metal decks to maintain traffic flow in the area. Skeletons with gold jewellery were also found during the station's construction. The NEL station opened on 20 June 2003. In March 2007, it was announced that the NEL will interchange with the DTL at this station. The DTL platforms opened on 27 December 2015 as part of Stage 2 of the line.

The station was designed to reflect Indian traditions, especially with the leaf-shaped patterns in the metal grills of the walls and the flowing fabric theme inspired by the Indian sari for the DTL station. Two artworks are featured at this station as part of the Art-in-Transit programme. Memoirs of the Past by S. Chandrasekaran, which is inspired by Indian traditional art, is displayed in the NEL station. Woven Field by Grace Tan features a geometric tessellation of metal plates embedded into the baffle wall above the DTL platforms.

== History ==
=== North East Line ===
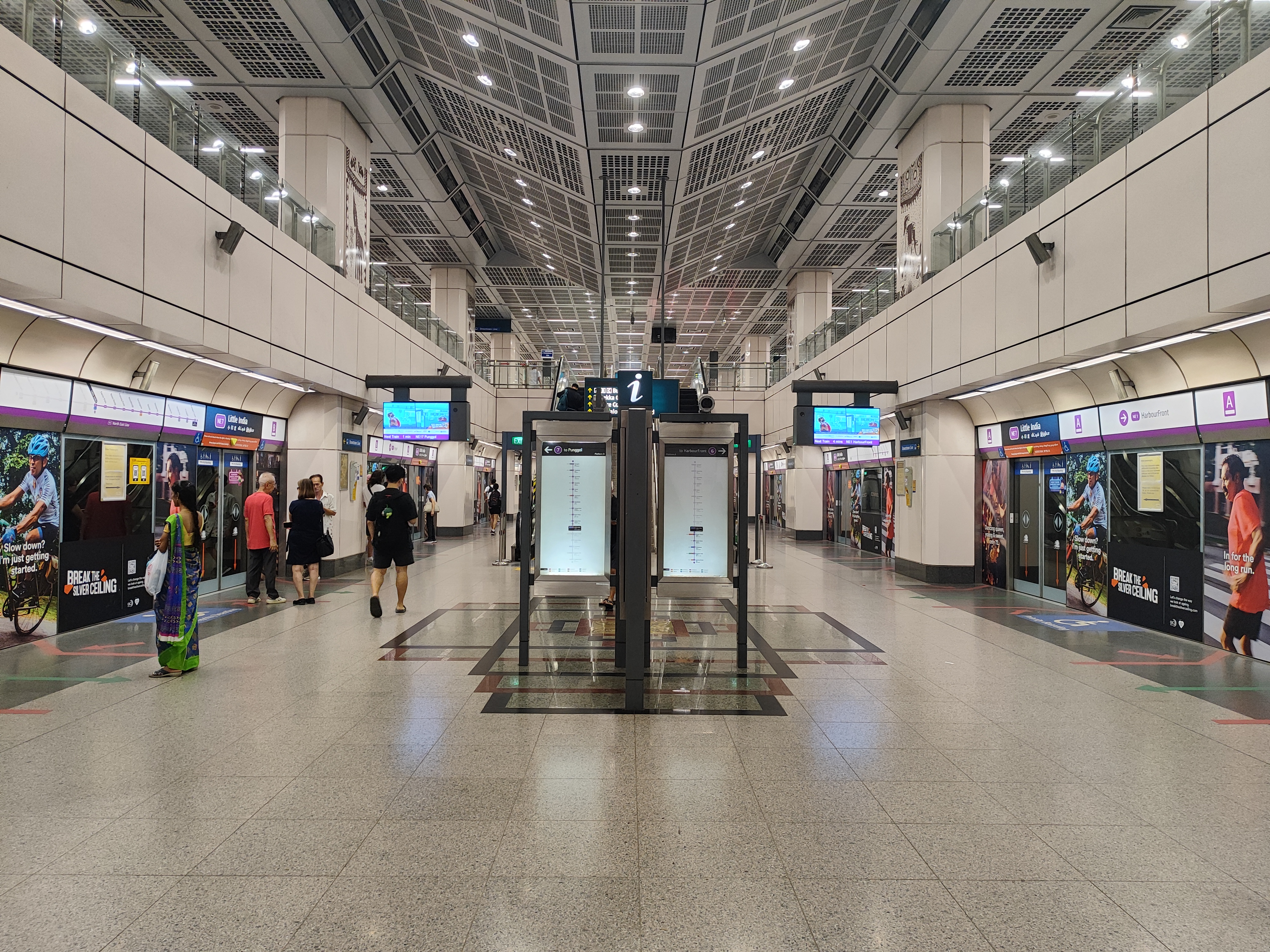
NEL platforms

In 1986, preliminary studies for the North East Line (NEL) commissioned by the MRT Corporation recommended that the line serve the Kandang Kerbau Hospital while the line paralleled the major Serangoon and Upper Serangoon Roads. The line was not considered financially viable by the Government of Singapore in 1989; it was only in January 1996 that the government approved plans to start the line's construction right away.

The station was first announced as "Kandang Kerbau" when the 16 NEL stations were revealed by communications minister Mah Bow Tan in March 1996. Residents near the station welcomed the news as they hoped that the station would give the district a "new lease of life" with more developments around the station, reported The Straits Times. The contract for the design and construction of Kandang Kerbau station was awarded to a joint venture between Hyundai Engineering & Construction and Zublin AG for S$311.56 million (US$209.8 million) in April 1997. The contract also included the construction of the adjacent Farrer Park station.

In October 1998, construction workers at the site unearthed human skeletons, some of which were adorned with gold jewellery. A few speculated the skeletons to be massacred victims during the Japanese occupation, or unidentified cadavers from a mortuary given the station's location at the old campus of Kandang Kerbau hospital, or part of a nearby cemetery at Kampung Java. Nevertheless, the exact origins of the skeletons remained unknown.

It was initially planned to close Buffalo Lane to facilitate construction works. However, as it was an important road for shoppers leaving Tekka Centre to Bukit Timah Road by car, the Moulmein Tekka Residents' Committee raised concerns of road congestion around the station site. Hence, a metal decking was constructed to keep Buffalo Lane open while works continued underneath. The decking had to be moved five times during construction works which impacted the construction schedule, costing the Land Transport Authority (LTA) about $1 million (US$0.6 million).

To construct the 53-metre (174 ft) underpass between Buffalo Lane and Bukit Timah Road underneath Bukit Timah Canal, the LTA dismissed the conventional cut-and-cover method as it would have disrupted vehicular traffic on Bukit Timah Road and risked flooding the road and the station due to obstructed water flow of the canal. The frontal segmental jacking method was briefly adopted until the discovery of boulders underground. Hence, the open-face tunnelling method was adopted, with metal decking built over the site that avoided traffic disruption of Bukit Timah Road.

When tunneling between the Little India and Farrer Park stations, the heritage buildings along Race Course Road required protection against ground settlement. As these buildings were built on 'strip footings' and shallow timber piles, they were supported by the installation of metal supports and were being closely observed for any movement. An old church near the tunnel excavation works, Foochow Methodist Church, was built on a combination of timber and H-piles, which caused uneven settlement and cracks to appear on the church walls. As a safety precaution, the church attendees temporarily relocated to the nearby Rex cinema while the LTA and church engineers strengthened the church foundation with steel supports and micropiles.

Malaysia property developer DRB-Hicom built Tekka Mall from March 2001 to May 2003; hoping to take advantage of crowds that would come from the station, according to Tekka Mall's marketing agent DTZ Debenham Tie Leung. The station commenced operations on 20 June 2003 as Little India station. The station's name change was criticised by the Singapore Heritage Society, which claimed that the new name was "misleading" to suggest that the area was the "main abode of Indians". They advocated keeping the original name as it better reflects the area's heritage.

=== Downtown Line ===
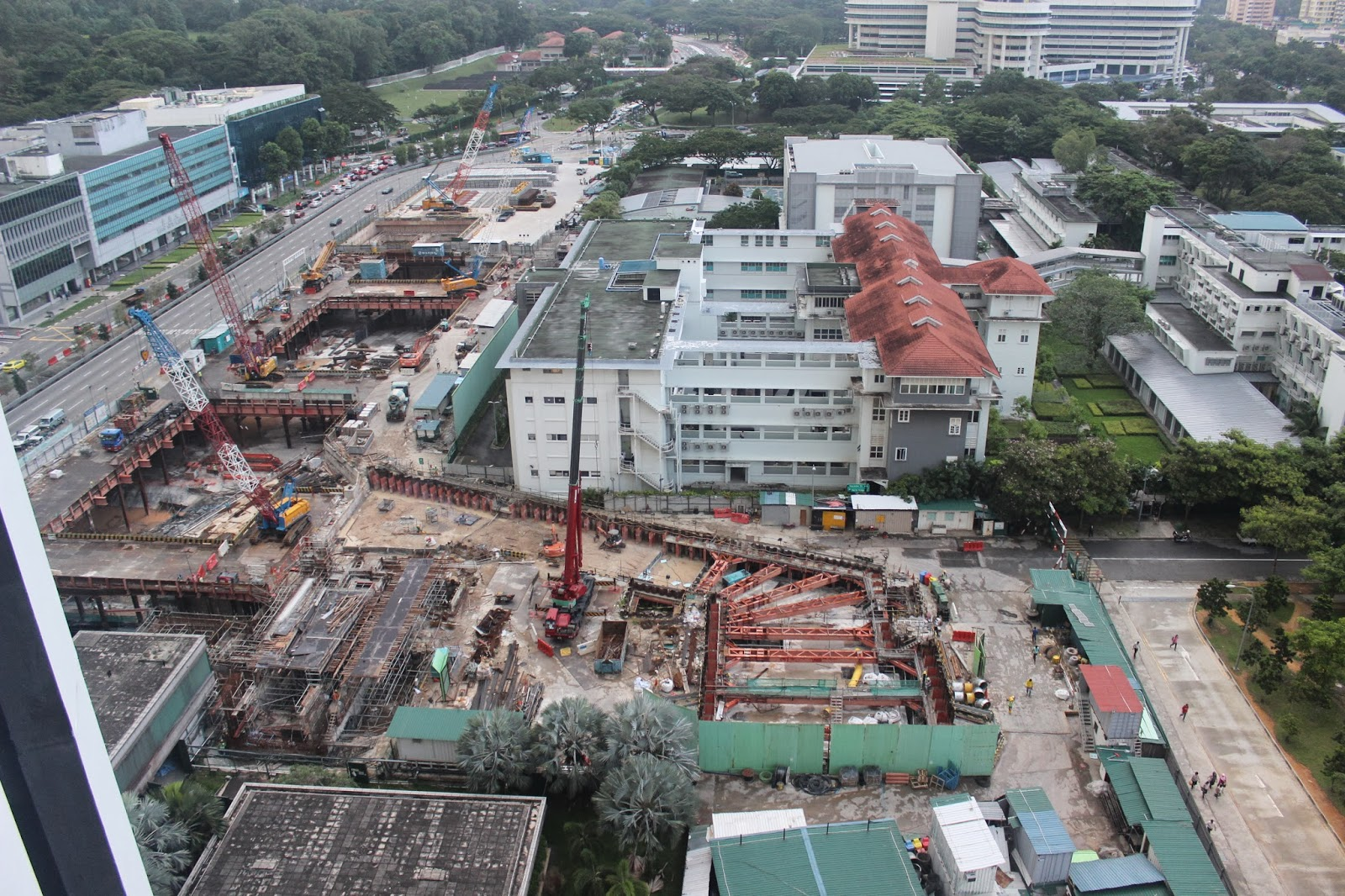
Construction site of the DTL station in 2013

The LTA announced in March 2007 that Little India station would become an interchange station with the addition of the Downtown Line (DTL). The LTA further announced on 15 July 2008 that the station would be part of DTL Stage 2 (DTL2). The contract for the design and construction of Little India station and tunnels was awarded to SsangYong Engineering & Construction Co. Ltd for S$803.3 million (US$552.3 million), announced the LTA in June 2009. The contract also included the construction of the adjacent Rochor station. The station's construction was arranged to start in the third quarter of 2009 with 2015 as the intended completion date.

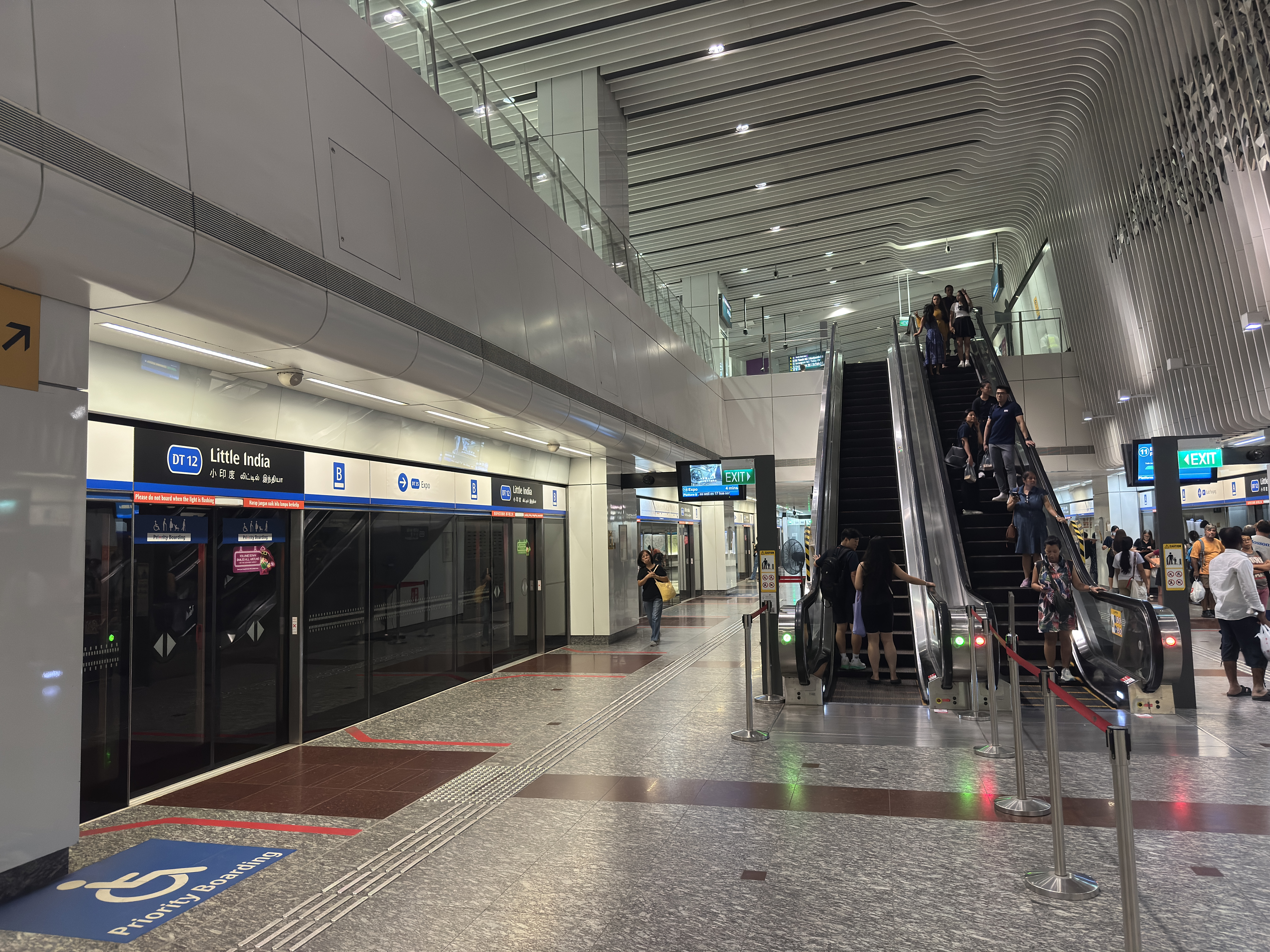
DTL platforms

A 58-metre (190 ft) section of the DTL tunnel below the NEL tunnels had to be manually mined due to the hard ground and the large boulders underground. At the DTL station site, a boulder about the size of a double decker bus was also broken into smaller pieces using specialised hydraulic machinery. On the night of 26 March 2014, a fire started at the construction site, but according to the LTA, it was put out in 30 minutes. As announced by the LTA in April 2015, the DTL station opened on 27 December.

== Details ==
Little India station is an interchange station on the NEL and the DTL, which are lines operated by SBS Transit. On the NEL, the station is between the Dhoby Ghaut and Farrer Park stations, while on the DTL, the station is between the Newton and Rochor stations. The station code is NE7/DT12. Located along Bukit Timah Road at the junction of Race Course Road, the station serves the similarly named ethnic neighbourhood Little India. Surrounding landmarks include Albert Court, the KK Women's & Children's Hospital, Tekka Market, Shree Lakshminarayan Temple and the Sri Veeramakaliamman Temple. Little India station is also close to Tanglin Police HQ and the LTA Hampshire office.

The station has six exits, with bus stops near Exits A and B, and taxi stands near Exits A and C. Designed to reflect Indian traditions, the metal grills of the NEL station walls have leaf-shaped patterns which may be similar to the door patterns of Hindu prayer rooms. The NEL station is designated as a Civil Defence (CD) shelter: it is designed to accommodate around 7,500 people, withstand airstrikes and remove toxic air. Equipment essential for the operations in the CD shelter is mounted on shock absorbers to prevent damage during a bombing. When the electrical supply to the shelter is disrupted, there are backup generators to keep operations going. The shelter has dedicated built-in decontamination chambers and dry toilets with collection bins that will send human waste out of the shelter.

The DTL station was designed by Architects61, which adopted a flowing fabric theme reminiscent of the Indian sari to reflect the vicinity's heritage. The NEL and DTL platforms are wheelchair-accessible. Tactile paving, consisting of tiles with rounded or elongated raised studs, guides visually impaired commuters through the station with dedicated routes that connect the station entrances to the platforms or between the lines. Wider fare gates allow easier access for wheelchair users into the station for both lines.

== Public artwork ==
The station displays three artworks as part of the MRT network's Art-in-Transit programme – a showcase of public artworks on the MRT network.

=== Memoirs of the Past ===
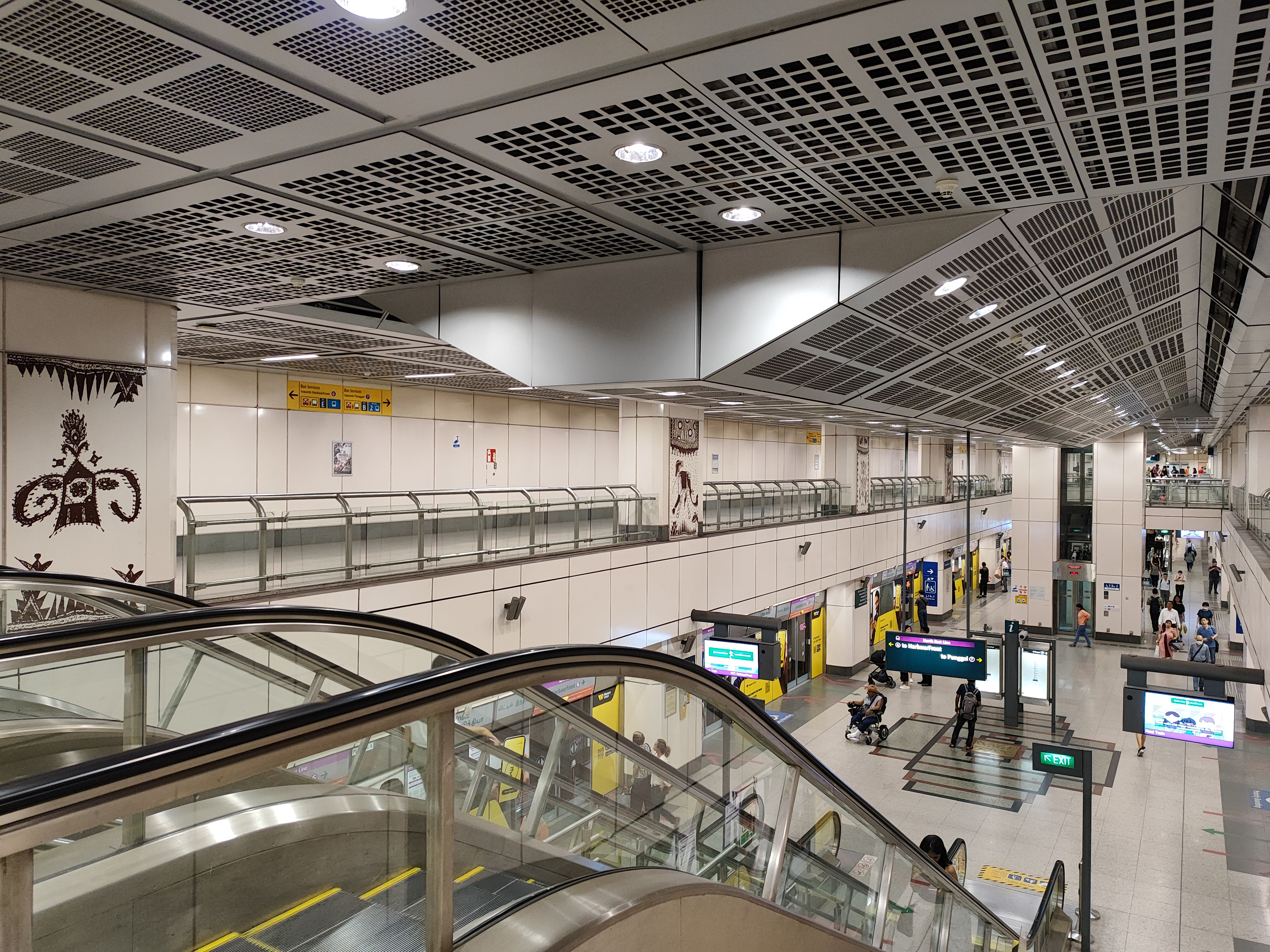
The stylised animal paintings on the walls above the NEL platforms

S. Chandrasekaran's artwork in the NEL station, Memoirs of the Past, consists of several sepia-coloured pieces honouring traditional Indian folk art. The work includes intricate bronze and granite floor designs and stylized animal paintings on the walls, referencing the area's historical buffalo stables. According to Chandrasekaran, the bronze kolam patterns represent Lord Shiva's third eye, symbolizing wisdom and insight. This third eye is also a motif throughout Chandrasekaran's work at Little India station.

Chandrasekaran recalls the daily ritual of making kolams by his Indian mother in his childhood home in Chinatown, though this Indian tradition is fading due to busy modern lifestyles. The kolam reminds him of the cycle of life and death, and symbolises the start of a new day, celebrating life, and giving thanks to God. Chandrasekaran's paintings at Little India reflect the influence of Rajasthani folk art, which he explored during his postgraduate studies in India. Characterised by raw, simplistic lines and exaggerated proportions, his work combines a child-like appeal with stylised abstraction. The sepia tones in these works align with the monochromatic earth tones in his other pieces.

Chandrasekaran said he initially proposed a more "abstract and intense" artwork for the station akin to his previous works; however, the "religious undertones or sexual connotations" were deemed unsuitable for a public space. After consultations with the LTA, he ultimately focused on themes of daily life and local memories, acknowledging that "public art must connect with commuters from all walks of life at a glance".

=== Woven Field ===
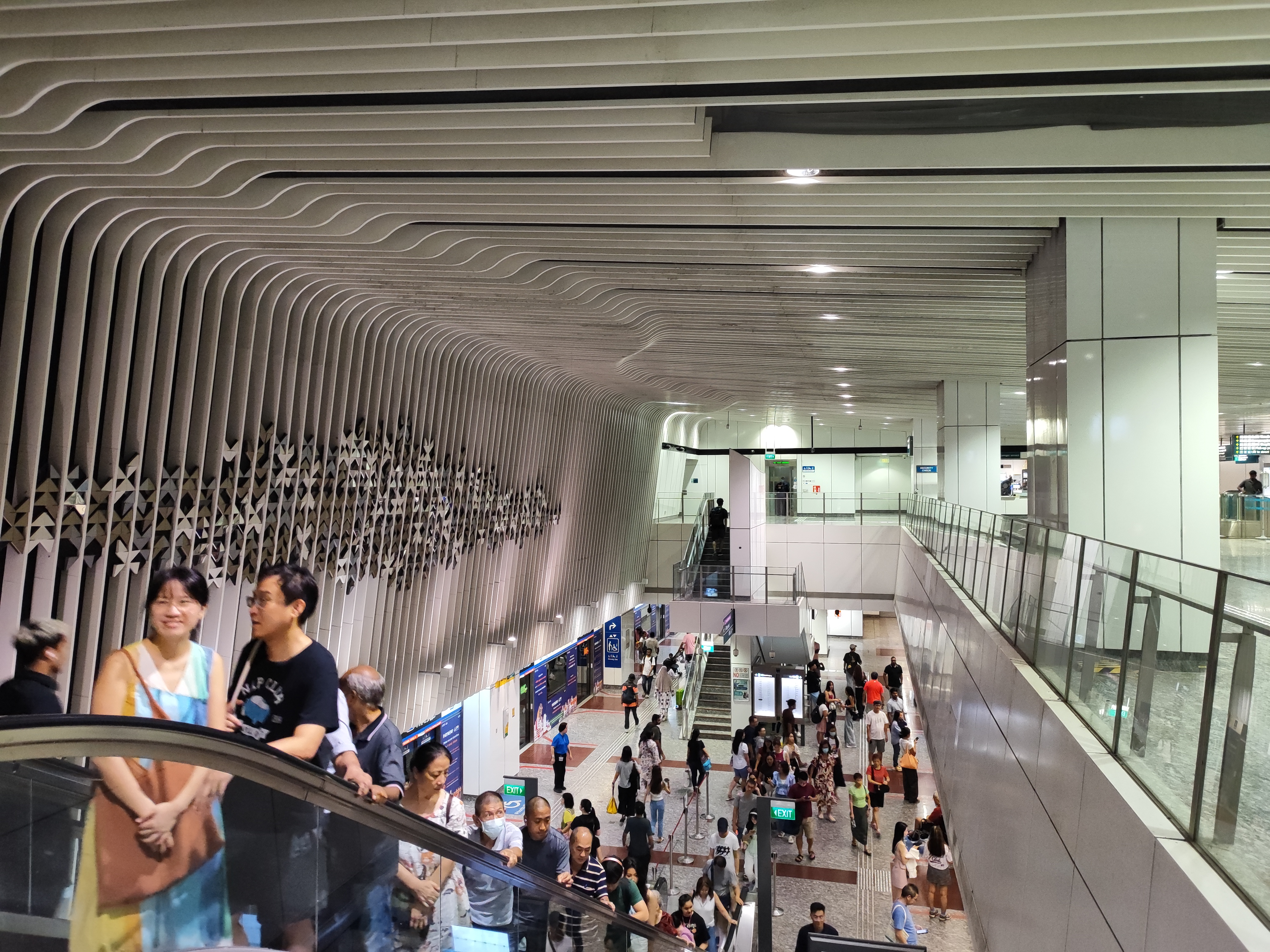
The artwork above the DTL Platforms

Grace Tan's Woven Field is a geometric tessellation of metal plates embedded into the station's aluminium baffle wall above the DTL platforms. Using black perforated aluminium trays to hold 1,000 triangular units in three metallic shades, the wavy-shaped work spans 15.93 metres (52.3 ft) with a height of 2.82 metres (9.3 ft). Triangular motifs within the work produce more complex imagery, including diamonds, butterflies, fish, and eight-petalled lotus, while blending with the station design "to form a single entity", according to Tan. Reflecting the Rochor Canal and movements of commuters, the work took inspiration from Indian sari patterns.

The flowing white baffle panels of the station's architecture induced Tan to think of vertical yarns on sari weavers' looms. She said this gave her the idea of "weaving" the artwork into the architecture to reinforce the design theme of its locality and place. Additionally, she was intrigued by the patterns found in saris – such as the fish, herringbone and lotus – that represent the diverse beliefs of Indian culture, and hence rendered these symbols to be expressed in geometric patterns.

=== Seeing History Through the Bamboo Forest ===
A 2.1 by 12.6 metres (6.9 ft × 41.3 ft) mural by Yeo Siak Goon was unveiled at Little India station to commemorate the 30th anniversary of the Land Transport Authority. At the forefront is a screen of bamboos, which refers to Little India’s colloquial Hokkien name, 'Tek Kah', which means 'at the foot of the bamboos'. The bamboos are accompanied by transport-related scenes of the British colonial era, including a rickshaw puller, trishaw rider, bullpen, bull-carts, and a 1950s public bus. The background panoramic collage depicts various landmarks including KK Women’s and Children’s Hospital, Tekka Centre, shophouses, a Hindu temple, and the LTA's Hampshire Office. According to the LTA, the artwork's juxtaposition of the past and the present in contrasting tones of monochrome and vivid colours reflects continuity across time. The artwork involved a five-month process including acrylic painting on canvas before high-resolution scanning and digital printing on aluminium panels.
