= Indian Heritage Centre =

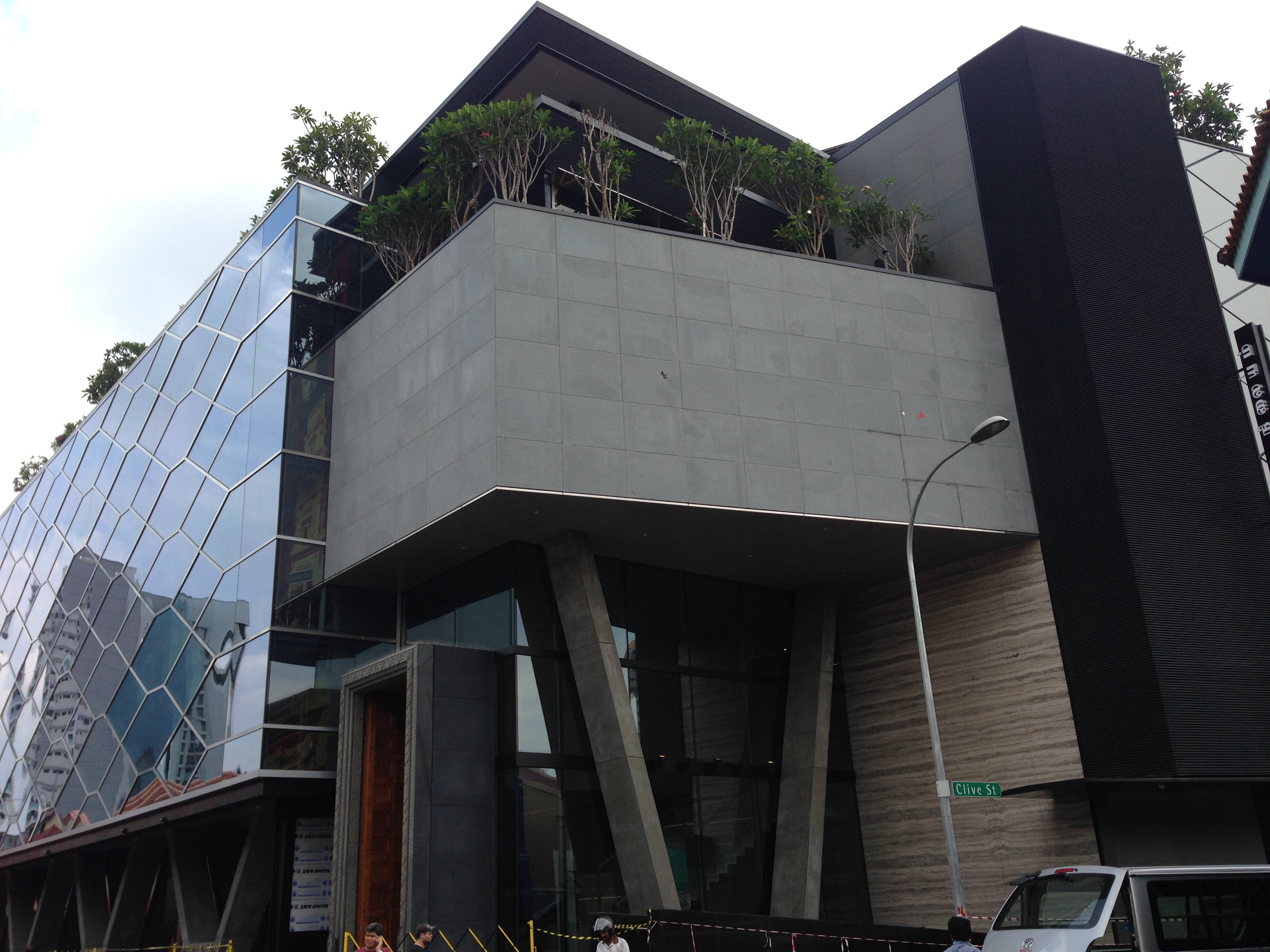
- Established: 7 May 2015; 11 years ago
- Location: 5 Campbell Lane, Singapore 209924
- Coordinates: 1°18′20″N 103°51′8″E
- Type: History museum
- General Manager: Saravanan Sadanandom
- Public transit access: Little India; Rochor; Jalan Besar
- Website: Indian Heritage Centre

The Indian Heritage Centre (Tamil: இந்திய மரபுடமை நிலையம்) is a cultural centre and museum in Singapore that showcases the culture, heritage and history of Indian Singaporeans.

== Background ==
Located at the Campbell Lane thoroughfare in the Little India precinct, the 3,090 square metres (33,300 sq ft) centre was launched on 7 May 2015.

The facade's architectural style is influenced by the baoli (or Indian stepwell), to seek an appreciation of the Indian culture.

== See also ==
- Singapore Indian Development Association
- List of Indian organisations in Singapore

The Indian Heritage Centre illuminated after sunset.	A mural of Singapore in the centre.	A pair of Hindu bull sculptures (Nandi) from Sri Sivan temple, which was demolished in the 1980s to build an MRT station. The temple was relocated. 20th century.
Interior of the centre.	Lower gallery (3rd floor) featuring traditional and historical costumes.	Lord Aravan, early 20th century, a central figure in the Theemithi (firewalking) festival.
