= S. Chandrasekaran =

Singaporean contemporary artist (born 1959)

- Born: November 29, 1959 (age 66); Singapore
- Education: Curtin University of Technology (BFA, MFA, DCA)
- Known for: Performance art, installation art
- Movement: Contemporary art

S. Chandrasekaran is a Singaporean contemporary artist known for his work in performance art in 1980s Singapore. He has held executive positions as Head of School at the Nanyang Academy of Fine Arts and LASALLE College of Arts.

== Early life and education ==
He received a diploma from the Nanyang Academy of Fine Arts in

He obtained his doctorate in cross-cultural studies in Performance Art from Curtin University in 2007.

== Career ==
He was a Senior Research Fellow at Institute of Southeast Asia, NAFA. He has also served as Academic Advisor for Postgraduate programs with Loughborough University/NAFA and Royal Melbourne Institute of Technology/LASALLE-SIA.

He is a founder/artistic director for the Biological Arts Theatre (BAT); a new media experimental theatre for Life Science and Arts. His research interests are cross-cultural studies, Asian aesthetics, life science, and experimental theatre. His teaching interests are life drawing, sculpture, alternative drawing, art photography, contemporary painting, installation art, performance art, new media, and cross disciplinary studies.

== Exhibitions ==
Chandrasekaran has been represented in major exhibitions, such as Havana Biennial (Cuba), 1st Asia Pacific Triennial (Brisbane), Asia-Pacific Performance Art Festival (Canada), International Performance Art Festival(Poland), 49th Venice Biennale and 8th Festival of Contemporary Art (Slovenia). He has been commissioned to work on public artworks such as for the World Sculpture Park at Changchun, China in 2001 and MRT station (Little India, Singapore).

The work titled Bioalloy and Body Performance was nominated for APBF Signature Art Prize (Singapore), 2003. He has been invited to international conference and seminars such as Biennale of Electronic Arts (Australia), 3rd Asia-Pacific Arts conference (Taipei) and XIV International Congress for Aesthetics (Slovenia) and University of South Wales (Sydney).

=== Solo Exhibition ===
- LIVING STORIES, Substation, Singapore, 2012
- AKASA, Earl Lu Gallery. LASALLE-SIA, College of the Arts, Singapore, 2002
- ICONS, Fort Canning Gallery, Singapore, 1996
- MADRAS MADLEY, Lalit Kala Academy, Madras, India, 1994

== Publications ==
- Living Stories, First Printers, Singapore, 2012
- Locating Self through Performance Art, LAP Lambert Academic Publishing AG & Co. KG, 2009
- Man and Modern Myth: A Dialogue, Yali Print Publications, India, 1994, Indran and S. Chandrasekaran.
