= Chinese language romanisation in Singapore =

The romanisation of the Chinese languages in Singapore is not dictated by a single policy, nor is its policy implementation consistent, as the local Chinese community is composed of a myriad of topolect groups. Although Hanyu Pinyin is adopted as the preferred romanisation system for Mandarin and the standard of Chinese education, the general lack of a romanisation standard for other Chinese varieties results in some level of inconsistency. This may be illustrated by the many variants for the same Chinese characters often found in surnames such as Low, Loh, Lo; Tay, Teh; Teo, Teoh; Yong, Yeong.

For example, the surname Zheng (traditional Chinese: 鄭; simplified Chinese: 郑) alone has several variations including Teh, Tay, Tee, Chang, Chung, Cheng, and Zeng. The variations Tay or Tee come from Singapore, while Teh or Tee normally have roots in Malaysia, Chang, Chung or Cheng from Hong Kong, and Zeng or Zheng normally from Mainland China.

== Place names ==
Since the founding of modern Singapore in 1819 and with large numbers of migrants predominantly from Southern China, Chinese placenames began to enter local vocabulary in place of traditionally Malay-based names mostly given by the Orang Laut communities. These names, however, are usually referred to in the dialects of whichever group accords that place a certain name, with some places having entirely different names for the same feature. In most places, however, the same name is used but referred to by an individual's dialect.

When there was a need to record place names by the British administration, Chinese place names were anglicised using an almost ad hoc means of finding the closest set of letters reflecting local pronunciations of these names; a situation which often spawned conflicting spellings, some of which still persist to this day. The older spelling of Chua Chu Kang (Chinese: 蔡厝港; pinyin: Càicuògǎng; Pe̍h-ōe-jī: Chhoà-chhù-káng), a suburban area and village in western Singapore, is now more commonly spelled as Choa Chu Kang after the new town by the same name took its spelling from Choa Chu Kang Road, itself an anomaly as the village and the surrounding cemeteries were then spelled in the old way. Today, the village no longer exists, but the cemeteries continue to be referred to as Chua Chu Kang, while all place names in Choa Chu Kang New Town take on the newer spelling.

From the mid-1980s, the drive to encourage the use of Pinyin filtered down to place names, resulting in some amendments. Aukang (also spelled "Aokang") is Teochew for Hougang (traditional Chinese: 後港; simplified Chinese: 后港; pinyin: Hòugǎng), but was romanised as Hougang when the Hougang New Town was built. Some changes met with popular opposition, particularly over the English spelling of Yishun (traditional Chinese: 義順; simplified Chinese: 义顺; pinyin: Yìshùn), which has been well known as Nee Soon in Teochew until the government tried to introduce pinyin when Yishun New Town appeared. The disagreements led to "Nee Soon" retaining its presence in Nee Soon Road, as well as some place names such as Nee Soon Camp and in the names of political subdivisions.

In contrast, pinyin was generally welcomed in Bishan (Chinese: 碧山; pinyin: Bìshān), named after what was popularly known as "Peck San" in Cantonese. The popularity was not over the pinyin system itself, but over the fact that Peck San was well known for its association with the Peck San Theng Cemetery, which has since been exhumed to build Bishan New Town. To the local Chinese, Bishan, although actually similar in name to Peck San in Chinese, is as good as a different name by virtue of its different romanisation spelling alone.

Another controversy surrounded the renaming of Tekka Market (derived from Hokkien Tek Kia Kha (Pe̍h-ōe-jī: Tek-á-kha), literally meaning "foot of the small bamboos"), then one of the largest wet markets in Singapore located at the junction of Serangoon and Bukit Timah Road. When the old market was torn down and rebuilt across the road, the new multi-use complex was named Zhujiao Centre, which is the pinyin version of that name. However, to locals, especially non-Chinese, the new word was both hard to read and pronounce and bore no resemblance to Tekka. Eventually, the complex was officially named Tekka Centre in 2000 after two decades of public pressure.

== Personal names ==
A large majority of Chinese people in Singapore are Hokkien (Min Nan speakers), and a lesser number Teochew. Hokkien and Teochew share many phonemes to the point that they are mutually intelligible. Thus the romanisations are similar and surnames such as Tan (traditional Chinese: 陳; simplified Chinese: 陈; pinyin: Chén), Chua (Chinese: 蔡; pinyin: Cài), Koh (traditional Chinese: 許; simplified Chinese: 许; pinyin: Xǔ), etc., are very common.
