= House of Tan Teng Niah =

Building in Little India, Singapore

Coordinates: 1°18′25″N 103°51′03″E

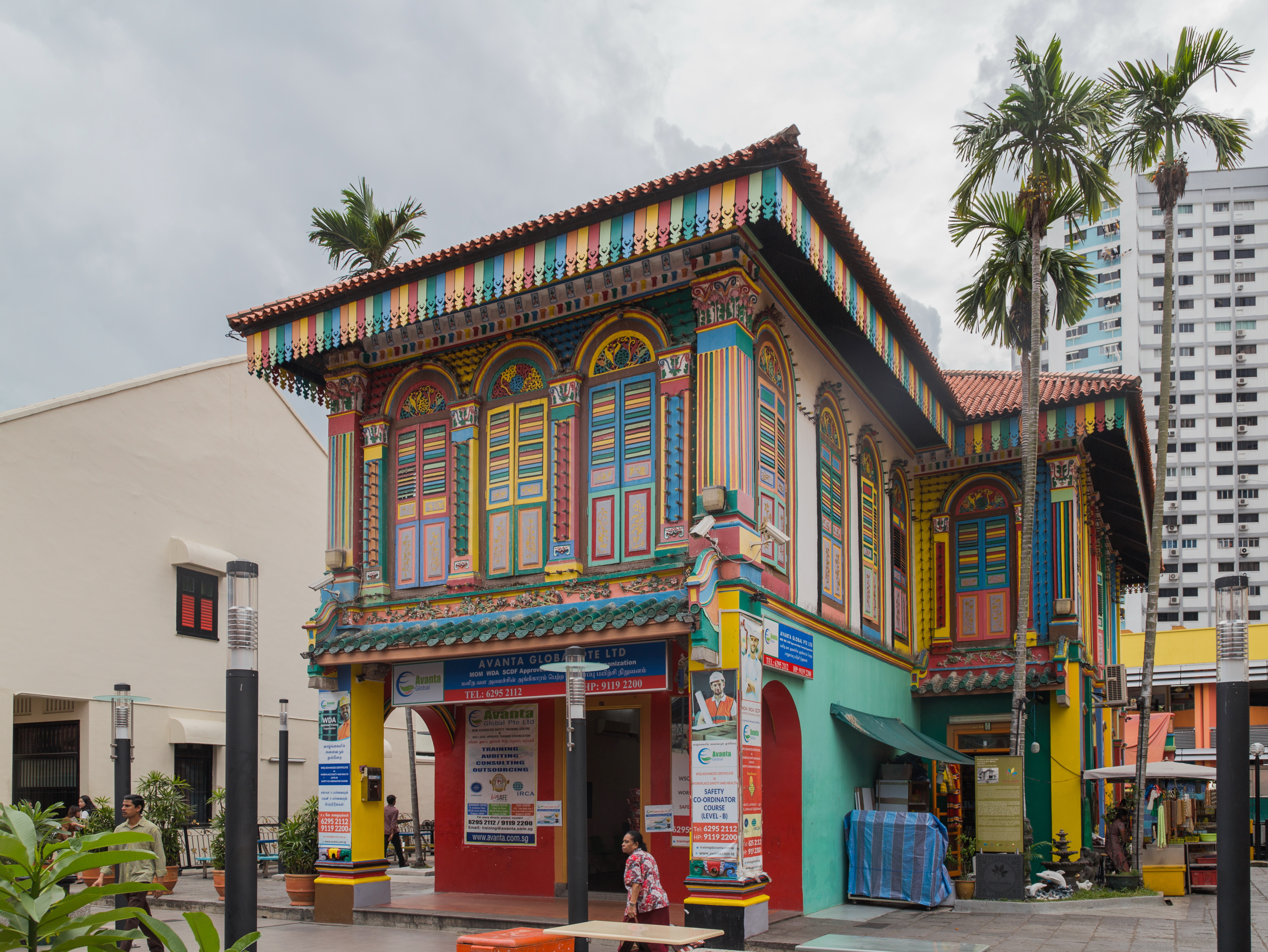
The building in 2016

The House of Tan Teng Niah is a building in Little India, Singapore. It is the last surviving Chinese villa in Little India.

== Description ==
The building has eight rooms and a five-foot way. It features a richly carved pintu pagar, a half-height outer door, and a gilded name plate above the entrance door with an inscription of the phrase Siew Song.

== History ==
The building was built by towkay (Chinese businessman) Tan Teng Niah in 1900. It is believed that Tan built the house for his wife. It was restored and conserved in the 1980s. The building is listed on the Little India Heritage Trail.
