= Sri Veeramakaliamman Temple =

Hindu temple in Singapore

Sri Veerama Kaliamman Temple
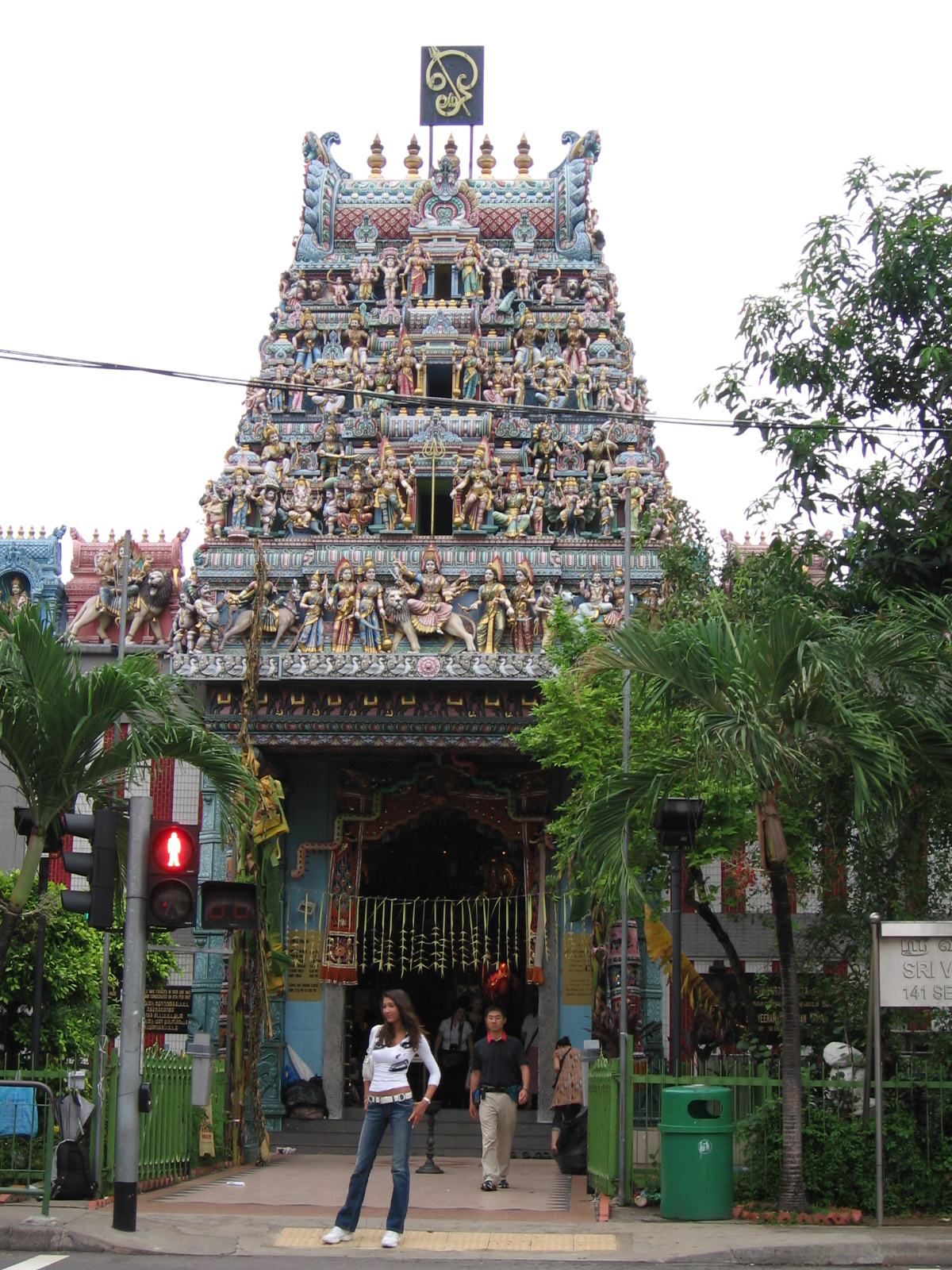
- Sri Veeramakalimman Temple

- Location in Singapore

Religion
- Affiliation: Hinduism
- Deity: Kali and Parvathi

Location
- Location: 141 Serangoon Road, Singapore 218042
- Country: Singapore
- Coordinates: 1°18′28.32″N 103°51′8.96″E

Architecture
- Type: Dravidian architecture

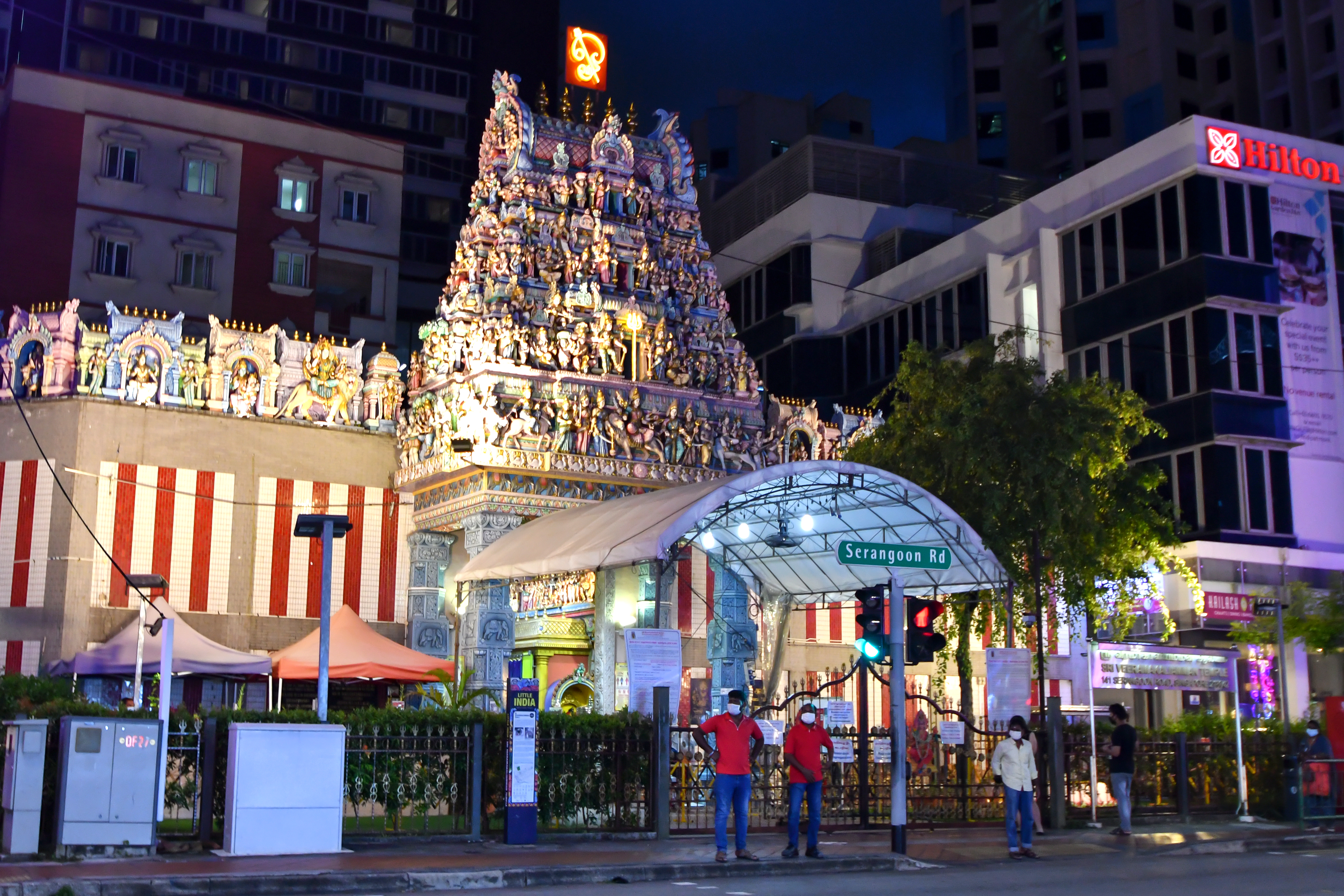
Illuminated front of the temple in 2020.

A floral display of Goddess Kali during Navaratri celebrations at Sri Veeramakaliamman Temple in 2026.

Sri Veeramakaliamman Temple (Tamil: ஸ்ரீ வீரமாகாளியம்மன் கோவில்; Chinese: 维拉马卡拉曼庙), also known earlier as Soonambu Kambam Kovil, is a Hindu temple located in the middle of Little India in the southern part of Singapore. The temple started as a shrine dedicated to the Hindu goddesses Kali and Parvati in 1855 before a temple was built by Bengali labourers in 1881.

== Architecture ==
Images of Kali within the temple show her wearing a garland of skulls and ripping out the insides of demons, and Parvati sharing a peaceful family moments with her sons Ganesha and Murugan.

The building is constructed in the style of South Indian Tamil temples common in Tamil Nadu as opposed to the style of Northeastern Indian Kali temples in Bengal, where Her worship is extremely widespread but the style of temple construction differs considerably.

== History ==
During the Japanese occupation of Singapore (1942–1945), the temple served as a refuge, sheltering over 20 vagrants nightly and providing them with food during Japanese air raids.

== Controversy ==
In 2018, the Charities Commissioner has barred the temple's chairman Sivakadacham, former chairman R Selvaraju, and secretary Ratha Krishnan Selvakumar from their posts, after the three, who were cheque signatories and approvers for payments, issued more than $1.5 million in uncrossed cheques. Of these, 45 cheques – totalling more than $227,000 – were not issued to the names of the intended recipients of the proceeds. The inquiry also revealed that Ratha had obtained loans of $350,000 without the management committee's approval and with no written loan agreements with the lenders. Cash loans and disbursements of proceeds from the loans were also not properly accounted for in the temple's records.
