= Little India, Singapore =

Little India
- Subzone of Rochor Planning Area
- Singapore

Other transcription(s)
  - Chinese: 小印度; Xiǎo Yìndù (Pinyin); Sió Ìn-tō͘ (Hokkien POJ)
  - Malay: Little India
  - Tamil: சிறிய இந்தியா Siṟiya intiyā (Transliteration)
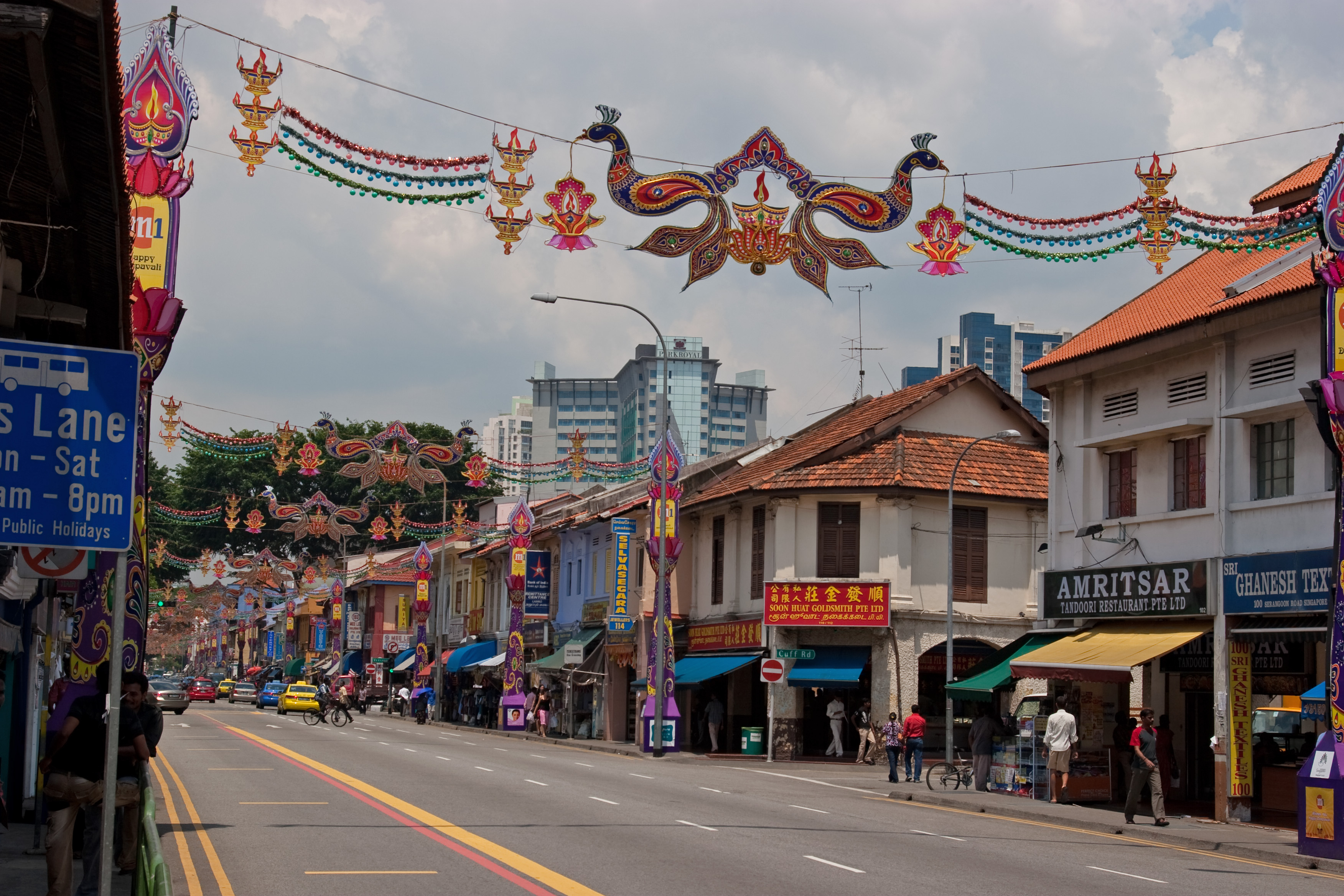
- Shophouses in Little India

- Location of Little India within Singapore
- Coordinates: 1.3065°N 103.8518°E
- Country: Singapore

Little India (Tamil: லிட்டில் இந்தியா) is an ethnic enclave in Singapore located east of the Singapore River, across from Chinatown, and north of Kampong Glam. Little India is commonly known as Tekka among the Indian Singaporean community. The precinct is notable for its markets, including the Tekka Market, and the festivals it hosts throughout the year, such as Deepavali and Thaipusam.

== History ==
Little India was initially a district used by Europeans for cattle trading, where Indian migrant workers found jobs, specializing in cattle rearing. Its location along the Serangoon River provided good conditions for raising livestock, resulting in the growth of that industry. The area would then be named after the area, causing it to be known as Serangoon. Eventually, the swamps were drained, and the European cattle farmers and traders moved out. Many of the cattle rearing migrant workers stayed, and the neighborhood became predominantly inhabited by South Asians, namely people of Indian descent. The Tamil Muslims, also known as Chulias, were among the earliest groups of Indian traders who arrived, engaging in commerce and various occupations, including infrastructure construction and serving in colonial positions.

Throughout the 1980s, the Singapore Tourism Board would then lead an effort to rename the area from Serangoon to Little India as it is known today. Little India was officially gazetted as a conservation area on 7 July 1989, with subsequent conservation of additional buildings along Desker Road, Syed Alwi Road, and Jalan Besar occurring over the following decades.

=== 2013 Little India riot ===
On 8 December 2013, a fatal accident occurred at SST 21:23 at the junction of Race Course Road and Hampshire Road. Sakthivel Kumarvelu, a 33-year-old Indian construction worker, was run over by a private bus, which was to transport migrant workers to their dormitories, and was killed. While emergency vehicles arrived at the accident, the migrant workers started a riot over the accident. Twenty-five emergency vehicles were damaged in the riots, alongside five that were set on fire. Video footage uploaded on the Internet shows rioters pushing police cars on their sides and setting an ambulance on fire. 39 police, four civil defence and auxiliary officers were injured.

There were an estimated 300 rioters while the Singapore Police Force dispatched 300 riot police. 27 arrests were made in relation to the riots where 24 were migrant labourers from India. Nine more labourers from Tamil Nadu were also arrested for their involvement in the riot with a total 33 workers who were eventually charged. In addition, 53 workers were deported for offences ranging from obstructing the police to failing to follow police orders to disperse, while 200 workers received formal advisories to obey the law.

The riot eventually led to the implementation of a new law, the Liquor Control (Supply and Consumption) Act in 2015 banning consumption of alcohol in all public places from 10:30 pm to 7 am. This also included banning the sales of alcohol products such as Rum and Raisin ice cream between the time periods, which was lifted in 2019.

== Culture ==
Deepavali 2026 festive lights at Little India.

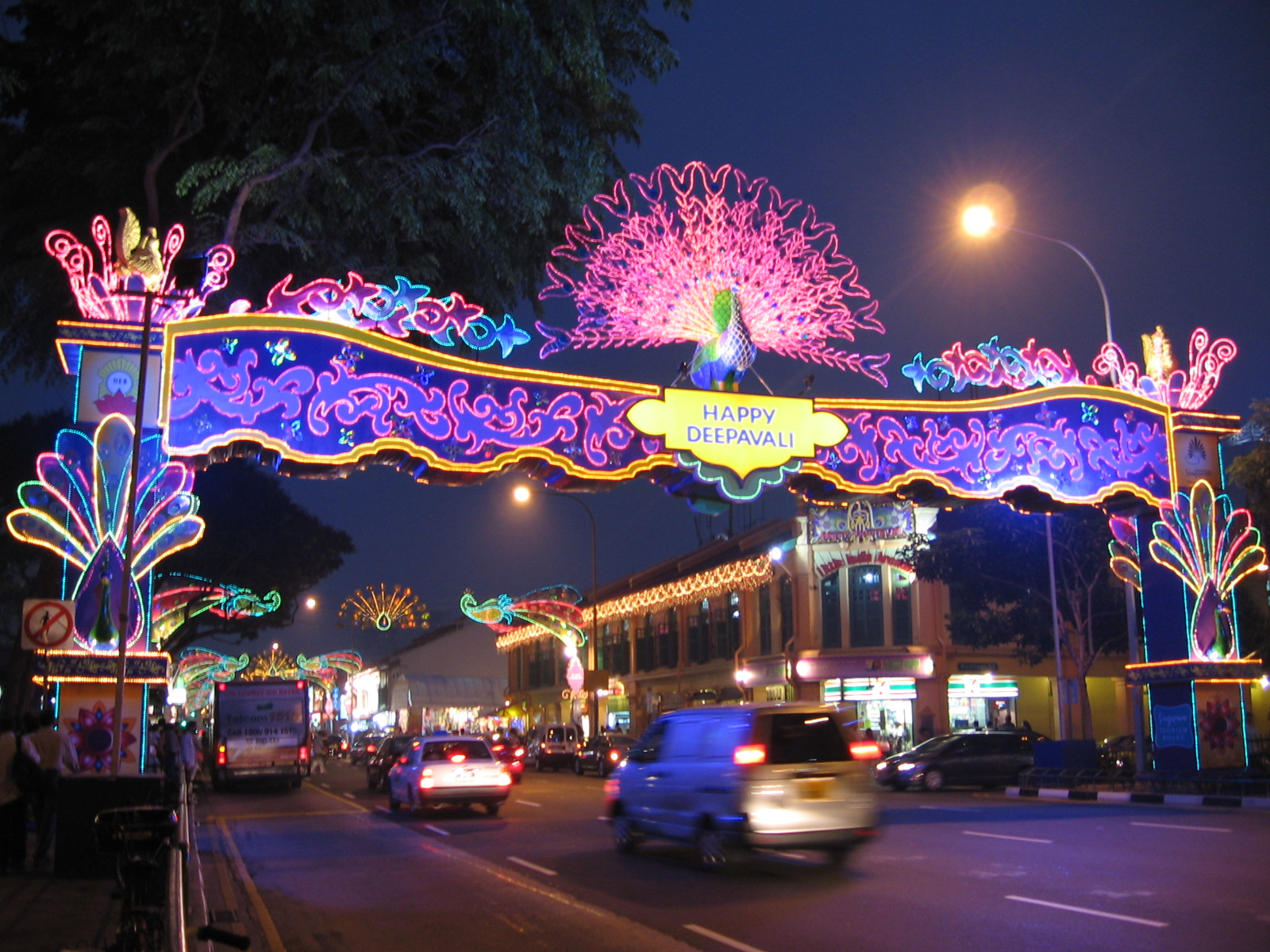
Little India during Deepavali

Under the Singapore government's policy of racial integration, Little India is deemed as a historical landmark. Many Indian businesses and cottage industries remain concentrated in Little India for the purpose of preserving cultural heritage. However, Little India is not the only zone in Singapore with a significant South Asian population, and Indian-dominant commercial zones can also be found in various Housing and Development Board estates.

Little India is also home to Chinese Clan Associations, places of worship for various religions, and a range of businesses, including those selling electrical supplies, hardware, second-hand goods, and traditional items such as spice grinders and groceries.

== Amenities ==
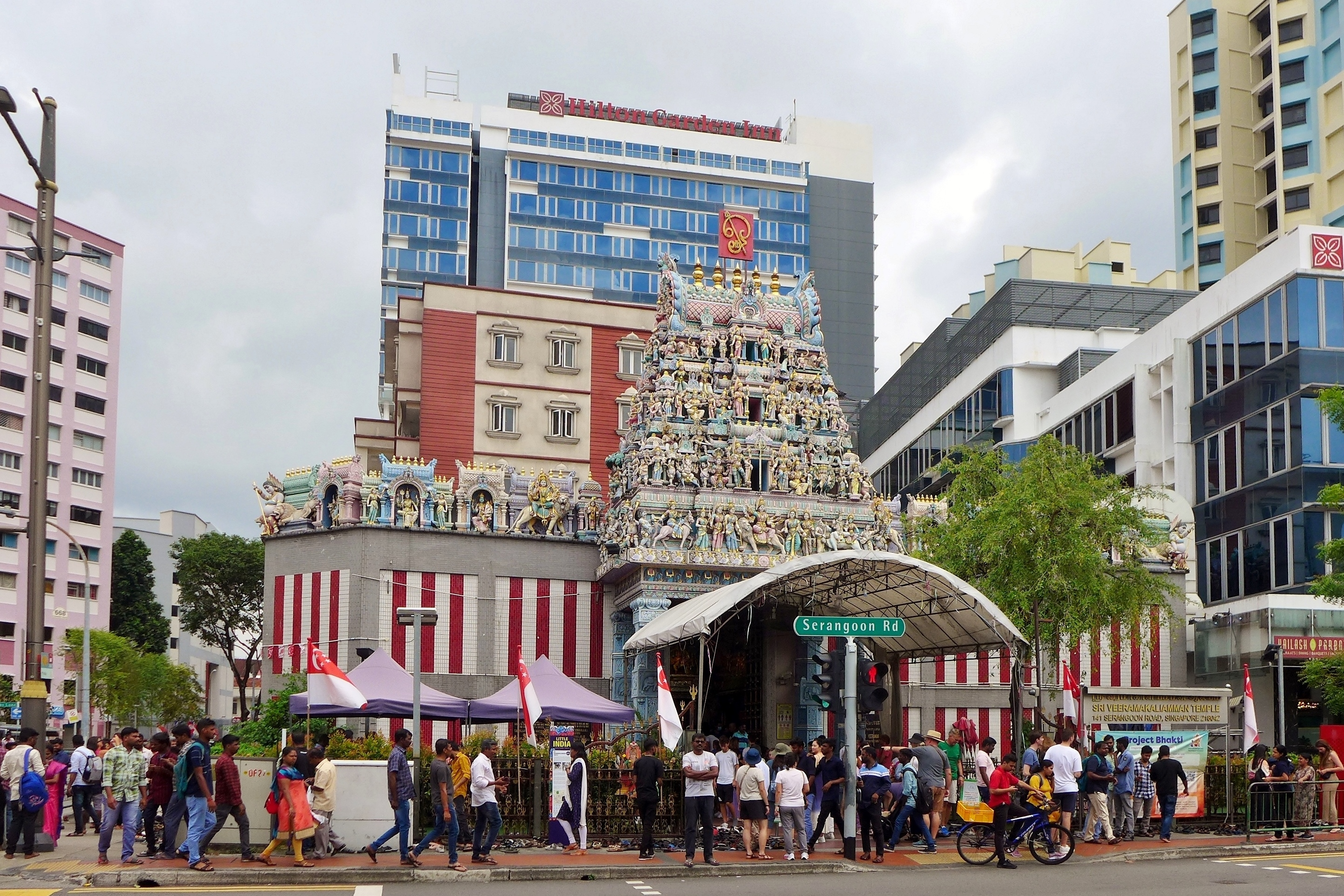
Sri Veeramakaliamman Temple, Little India

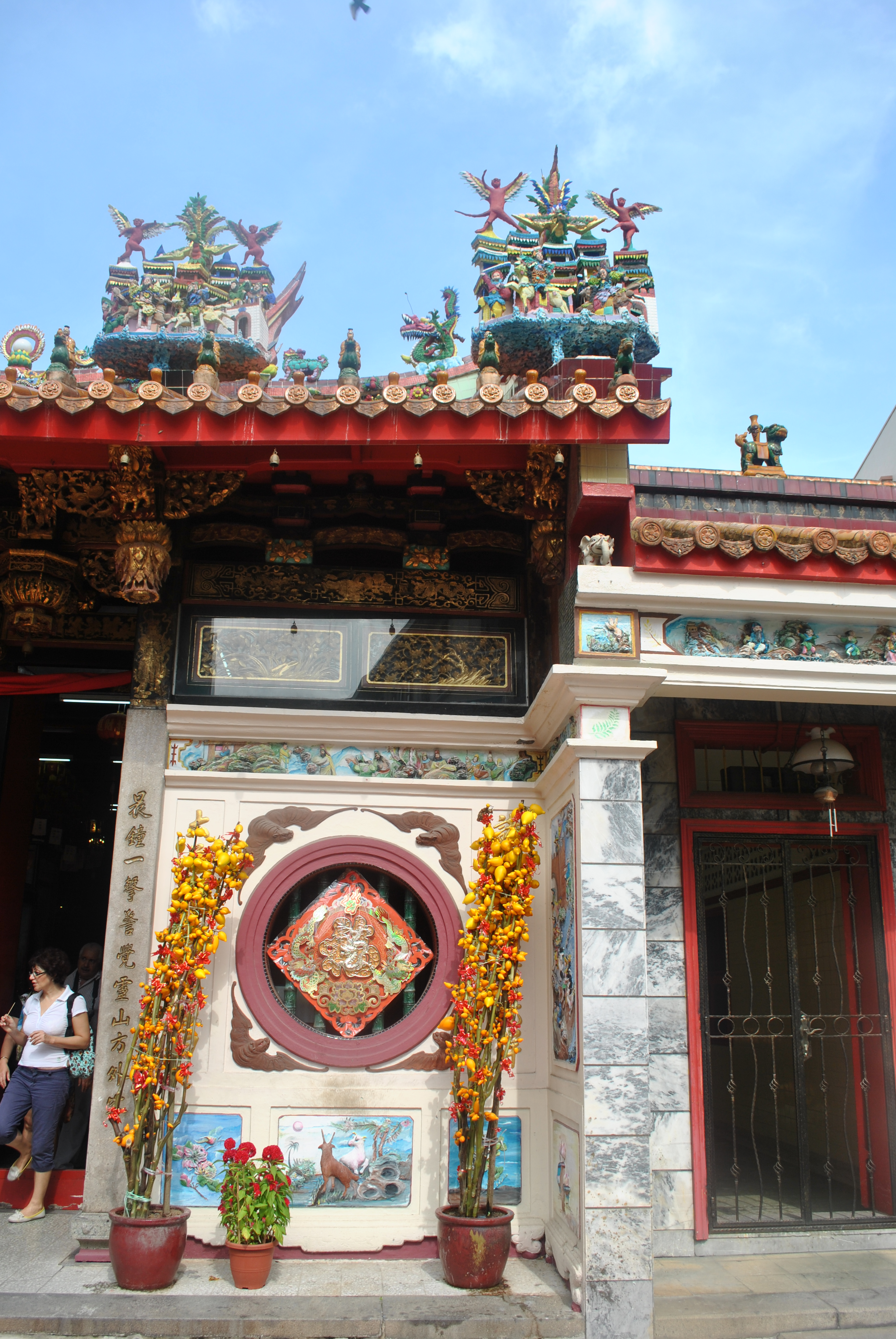
Leong San See Temple

Along Serangoon Road are the Tekka Centre, the Tekka Mall, the Little India Arcade, Serangoon Plaza, and the Mustafa Centre (on a side road). Farrer Park Fields is located in the district.

Little India is also home to several art houses. In 1985, the National Arts Council launched the Arts Housing Scheme, aimed at identifying and renovating old buildings for arts and cultural activities. A line of shophouses along Kerbau Road were designated for the project, and the area is currently known as the Little India Arts Belt. As of 2011, there are seven arts organizations in the Belt. Three are contemporary theatre companies, while the other organizations involve traditional arts such as Malay dance and Indian theatre.

=== Places of worship ===
==== Churches ====
- Foochow Methodist Church
- Kampong Kapor Methodist Church (completed in 1929)

==== Temples ====
- The Sakya Muni Buddha Gaya Temple, along Racecourse Road, was established by a Thai monk, Venerable Vutthisasara, in 1927.
- Leong San See Temple was built in 1917 and is dedicated to Guanyin, Bodhisattva of Compassion.
- Far Kor Sun Monkey God Temple

==== Hindu temples ====
- Sri Veeramakaliamman Temple
- Sri Vadapathira Kaliamman Temple

==== Mosques ====
- Angullia Mosque
- Jalan Mosque

== Notable places ==
- House of Tan Teng Niah
- Sri Veerakaliamman Temple
- Indian Heritage Centre
- Srinivasa Perumal Temple
- Indian Heritage Centre
- Masjid Abdul Gaffoor
- Little India Arcade
- Tekka Centre
- Jothi Store And Flower Shop
- Mustafa Jewellery

== Transport ==
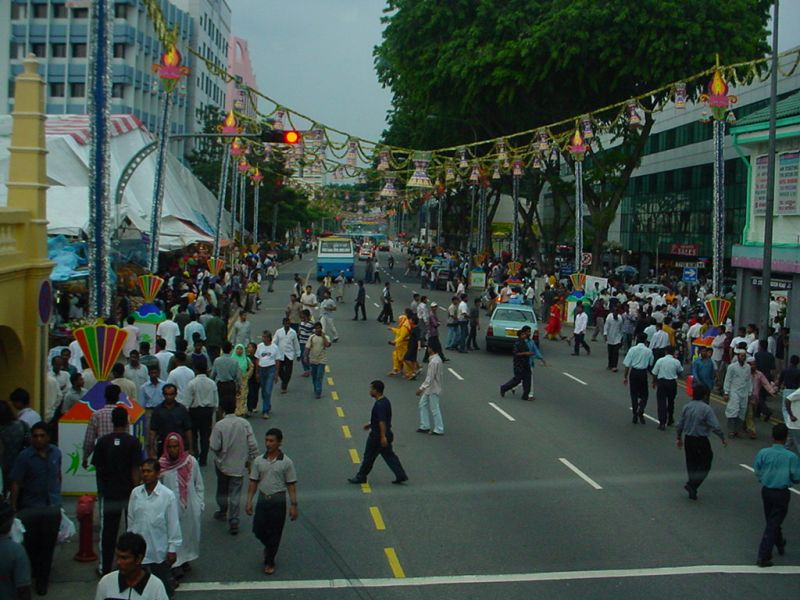
Street in Little India

Serangoon Road is the main commercial thoroughfare in Little India. It intersects Rochor Canal Road and Bukit Timah Sungei Road.

The area is served by the MRT on the North East line (at Little India and Farrer Park) and Downtown line (at Rochor and Jalan Besar). Bus services 23, 64, 65, 67, 131, 139, 147, and 857 pass through Little India via Serangoon Road.

== Gallery ==
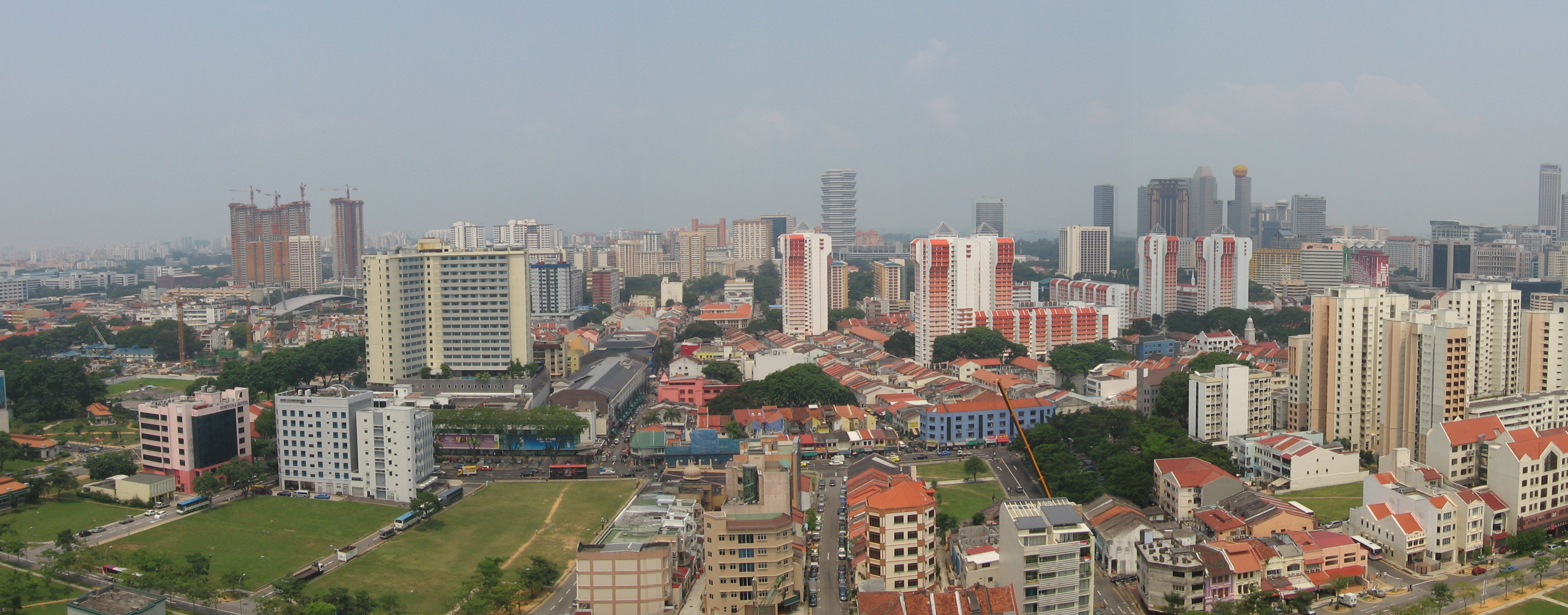
Panoramic view of Little India. Taken from Farrer Park View Housing Estate.

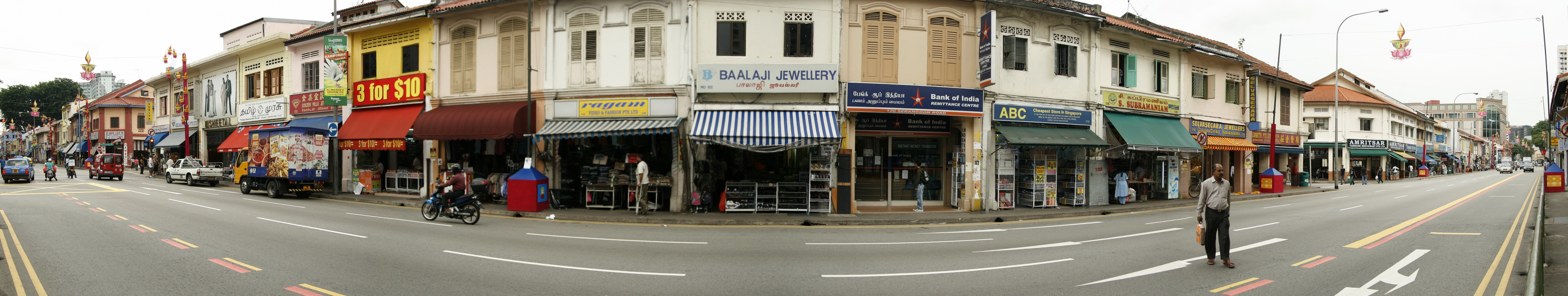
Panoramic view of Little India. Taken from Serangoon Road.

== See also ==
- Collapse of Hotel New World
- City Square Mall
- Jalan Besar
- New World Amusement Park
- The Verge, Singapore
- Singapore
- Changi Airport
- Lavender
