= Sungei Road =

Coordinates: 01°18′16.56″N 103°51′23.02″E

- Subzone of Rochor Planning Area

Name transcription(s)
  - Chinese: 双溪路 (nicknamed 结霜桥)
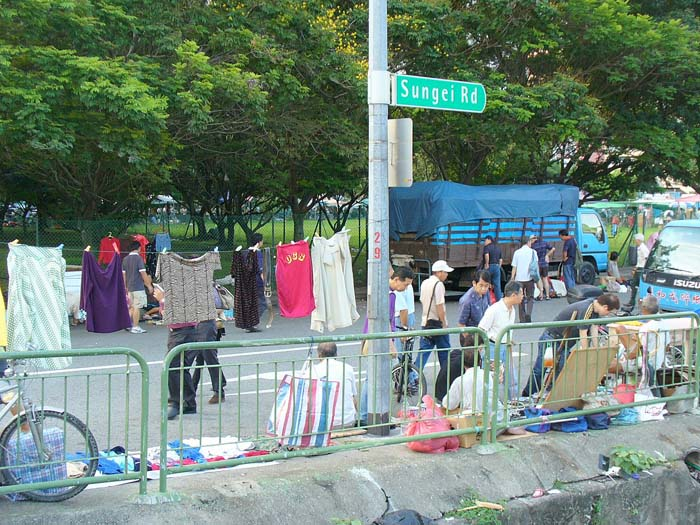
- Sungei Road, Singapore
- Interactive map of Sungei Road
- Country: Singapore

Sungei Road (IPA: /ˈsʊŋaɪ/ SUUNG-eye, Chinese: 双溪路) is a road in Singapore situated between Serangoon Road and Jalan Besar and runs along the Rochor Canal. The area around Sungei Road formerly housed affluent Europeans and Asians, and many ornately designed buildings were built there. Since the 1930s, the road has been synonymous with Sungei Road laksa (a local spicy noodle soup) and the Thieves' Market, the largest and oldest flea market in Singapore, where locals can shop for old bric-a-brac or second-hand goods. The market was permanently closed on 10 July 2017 for "future residential development use".

== Etymology ==
Sungei Road got its name because it runs along the banks of the Rochor River (Sungei Rochor), hence its Malay name, sungei, meaning "river". Sungei Road starts opposite the former Kandang Kerbau police station and was therefore known to the Chinese as "tek kah ma ta chu", which means "tek kah police station" in Hokkien.

== History ==
In the 1820s, the area around Sungei Road was designated by Sir Stamford Raffles, the founder of modern Singapore, for the homes of affluent Europeans and Asians, when he divided the early settlements according to different ethnic groups. The Arabs and Malays who had settled at Sungei Road previously were relocated eastwards to Kampong Glam. Ornately designed two-storey and three-storey shophouses that came with covered 5-foot (1.5 m) way were built in its place.

At nearby Lavender Street was the attap house of Cho Ah Chee, the carpenter of the ship S.S Indiana in which Raffles travelled to Singapore in 1819. It is believed that Raffles gave the house to Guangdong-born Cho, in recognition of his services at the time of the founding of Singapore. The house was demolished in the 1970s and a small public park has taken its place.

During the Japanese Occupation of Singapore, a street market known as Robinson Petang meaning "evening Robinsons", started along the banks of the Rochor Canal where the poor could buy cheap household wares and other merchandise in short supply, akin to what department store Robinson & Co. had sold.

=== Thieves' Market ===
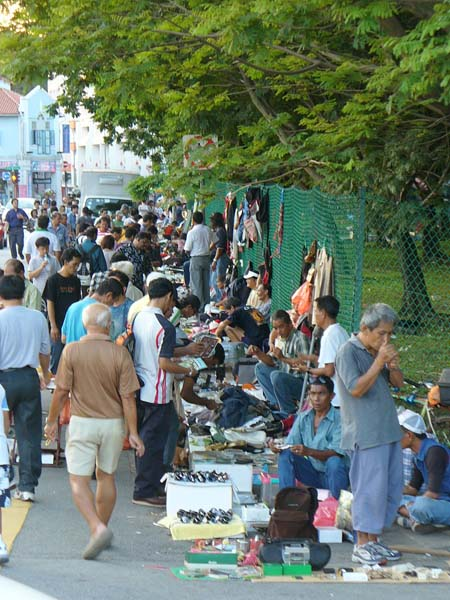
Street hawkers peddling their wares at Sungei Road

From the 1930s, Sungei Road and its surrounding roads became a flea market better known as the Thieves' Market, because all sorts of second-hand merchandise as well as contraband goods were sold here. The peddlers may change from day to day and there were no receipts, so refunds are impossible. Until the British Army withdrawal in the late 1960s, it was also a place to buy army merchandise like uniforms, army gear and other army surplus, possibly looted earlier from British military stores. The open-air market soon acquired a bad reputation as the major dissemination venue for stolen goods that would last to the present day. If an item was "lost" recently, people can try their luck in looking for it at the Thieves' Market, and buying it back from the sellers who will always claim no knowledge of its source.

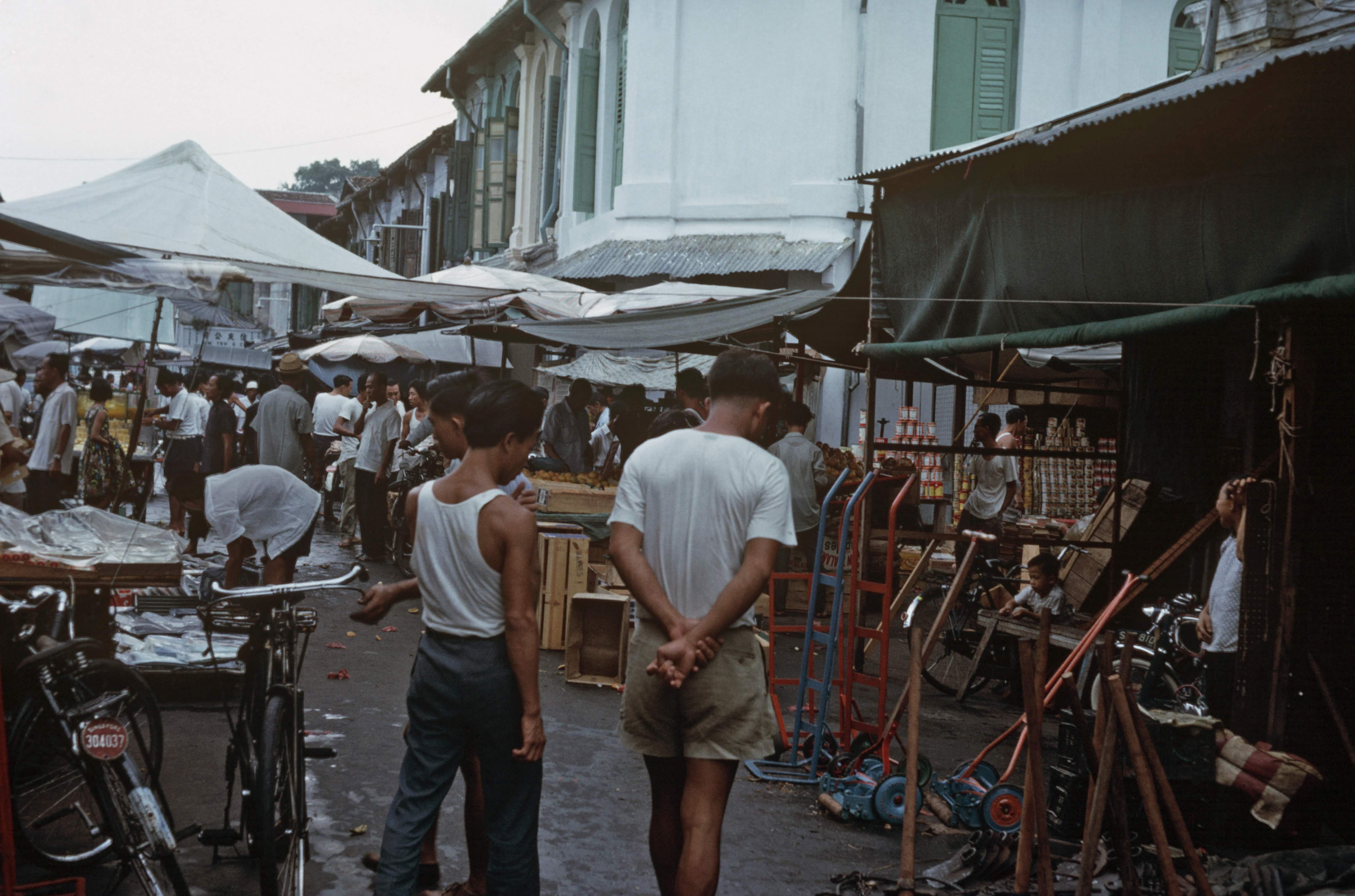
Thieves' Market in 1965

In the early 1970s, opium dens used to be common in the Sungei Road area. The drugs were popular with workers looking for a cheap way to ease the hardship of the day's toil. The opium addicts were mainly poor, elderly people from working-class groups. In early 1991, a spate of fires destroyed more than 20 shophouses along Sungei Road. Most of the century-old shophouses, crumbling with age, had become potential fire hazards for its residents. The first fire incident left two people injured and 61 homeless. As a result, many of its buildings were torn down for safety reason and its inhabitants relocated in later years.

In the mid-1990s, the old shop house buildings were torn down, resulting in street peddlers displaying their wares on canvas sheets along the empty roads in the area. The peddlers did not pay rent, but the Singapore government forbade them from selling brand-new items. To keep up with the times, some of the peddlers put up their wares to sell on websites and eBay, especially those hard to sell items such as old photographs, badges, medals and other collector's items. The market remained until its final closure by the authorities on 10 July 2017.

=== Success stories ===
Despite its notorious reputation, there were a few cases of honest and hardworking karung guni men who made good, and became millionaires. One was Poon Buck Seng who started his business with only a capital of S$50 by picking up junk, or paying small amounts for things people were throwing away in the 1980s. He would then take his goods to sell at the Sungei Road Thieves' Market. Within seven years, he had saved enough money to rent a shop space nearby, and expanded his business to sell bigger used items like computers, refrigerators, videotape recorders and television sets, in addition to old clothes, shoes and records. In 1993, he registered his second-hand goods trading business and began to focus his business in exporting used computer parts, as there were not many people doing that back then, and his business thrived. He made a few thousand dollars every month and five years later, Poon had saved enough money to buy a 1,636 square feet (152.0 m^{2}) freehold property worth S$730,000 and was offered S$1.4 million for the unit in a collective sale later. His export business lasted only 10 years. By 2002, Poon's business was declining as too many people had jumped onto the bandwagon. He decided to end his export business and went back to his old karung guni trade again that lasts to this very day.

Another similar rags-to-riches story is Pang Lim, who was an illegal fruit hawker in Sungei Road in the 1970s. His big break came when he saved enough money to rent a coffee shop in 1990 with his younger brother and uncle. They rented the stalls out to other hawkers and managed the drinks stall themselves. The business took off and from one coffee shop, Pang is now the managing director of Koufu, which operates 20 foodcourts, five coffee shops and five cafes around the island.

== Landmarks ==
=== Sungei Road Laksa ===
Located nearby at Jin Shui Kopitiam ("kopitiam" means "coffeeshop" in Hokkien) is a stall selling Sungei Road laksa, a local spicy noodle soup that originated from Peranakan culture. The Sungei Road laksa legacy was started in 1956 when a Hainanese friend of Wong, Ah Tong, gave Wong and his brother Wong Yew Poh, his secret recipe for laksa on account of their long-standing friendship. The Wong brothers set up a push-cart stall to sell their laksa and the response to their recipe was overwhelming. It was sold with the thick bee hoon (Chinese noodle) cut up and served only with a spoon, without chopsticks, topped with cockles, bean sprouts and home-made fried fish cakes in distinctive chicken motif bowls. Customers ate it while standing by the roadside and it cost only 20 cents a bowl back then. By day, they sold along Johor Road and by night, off Sungei Road. Today, the brothers have since lost contact with Ah Tong, but their children still serve the traditional recipe, using charcoal fire to keep his gravy constantly warm to maintain its distinctive flavour. It is regarded among the best laksa stalls in Singapore by many food reviewers.

=== Singapore Ice Works ===
Located at the junction of Sungei Road and Pitt Road, was the former site of the Singapore Ice Works that was built in the 1930s. The factory was the first ice-making plant in Singapore using large compressors manufactured mainly from Carrier and York corporations. It was popular as a pioneer establishment that brought refrigeration and air-conditioning to Singapore. In 1958, it was renamed as the New Singapore Ice Works. In later years, the factory was bought over by Cold Storage who ran it under their management. However, in 1984, the Housing Development Board (HDB) took over its site for redevelopment. The factory was soon demolished and the plant operations was re-located to Auric Pacific at Fishery Port Road. This facility has since closed down after being in use for over twenty years.

=== Rochor Market ===
The Rochor Market, a wet market, was another popular landmark in this area. Built in 1872, it served the surrounding community for more than a century. In August 1982, part of the market was demolished and its stalls were moved elsewhere.

== Closure ==
Despite its long history, the flea market was permanently closed on 10 July 2017, with government authorities reclaiming the land for "future residential development". Plans for vendors to relocate to the rooftop carpark of Golden Mile Tower have so far been unsuccessful. A group of vendors from the flea market now ply their trade at legally rented public areas. One of such area is the Market Gaia Guni situated at Woodlands industrial area.

== See also ==
- Bugis Street
- Middle Road, Singapore
- New World Amusement Park
