= Dunlop Street, Singapore =

Street in Singapore

Dunlop Street
- Rangsamy Road
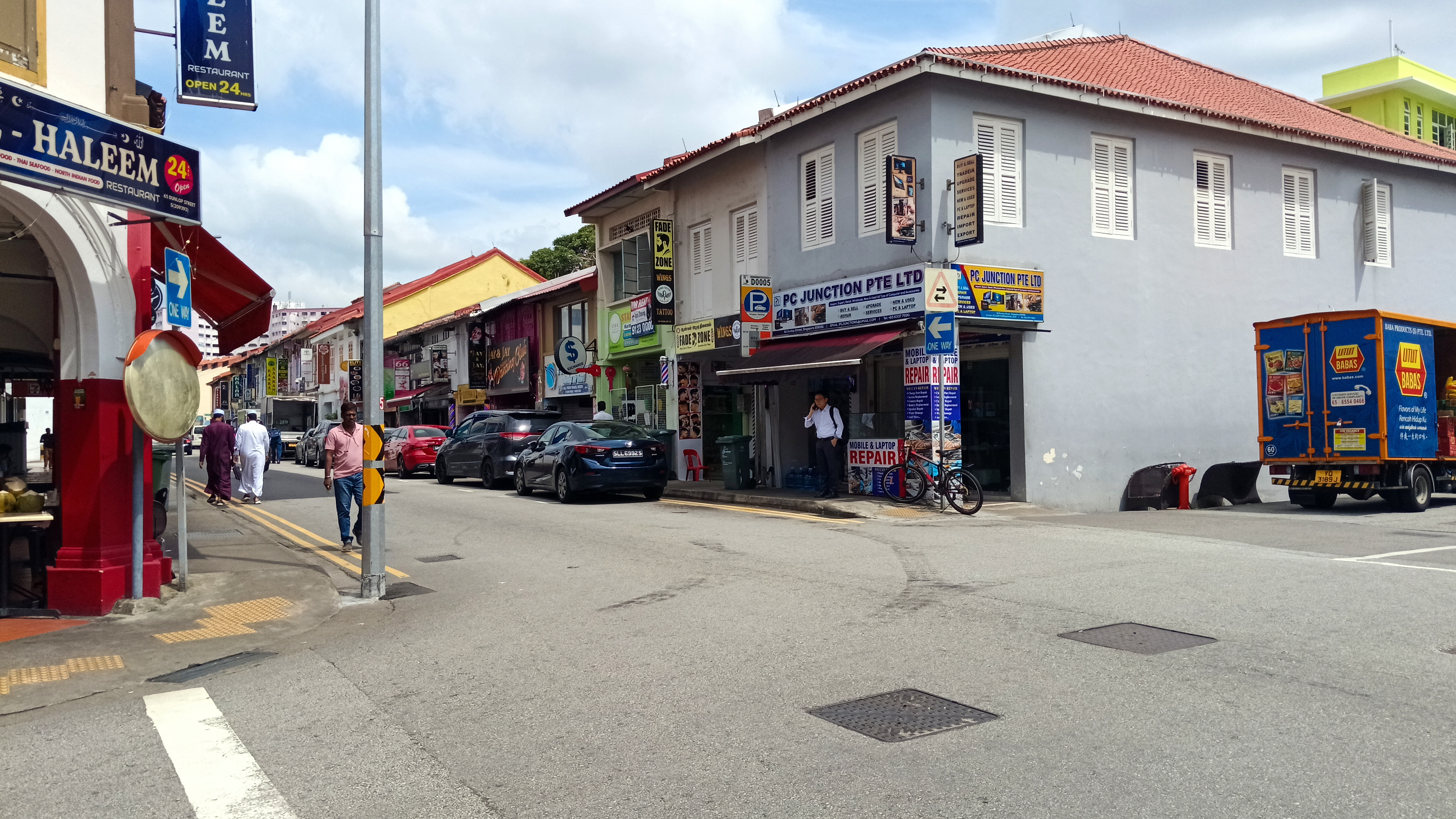
- The middle part of Dunlop Street which intersects with Perak Road.
- Owner: Land Transport Authority (LTA); Urban Redevelopment Authority (URA)
- Maintained by: LTA
- Nearest Mass Rapid Transit System station: Rochor MRT station Jalan Besar MRT station

Other
- Known for: Masjid Abdul Gaffoor, a national monument

Dunlop Street is the name of a street in Singapore, located in the Little India district within the Rochor Planning Area. It connects Jalan Besar to Serangoon Road and intersects with Perak Road and Clive Road, all located in the same area. Dunlop Street is part of the conserved areas in the Little India district, under the purview of the URA.

The origin of its name is not known, although it has been widely speculated that the street is named after Colonel Samuel Dunlop, a British civil servant who served as the Inspector-General of the police in colonial Singapore. A lesser known theory suggests that the street was named after A. E. Dunlop, who was the secretary of the Race Course Committee in Serangoon. Before the street had its current name, it was known as Rangasamy Road.

== Landmarks ==
Dunlop Street is lined on either side with terrace-roof shophouses, with some of them being Indian restaurants, pubs, or hostels for backpackers and tourists in the area. Masjid Abdul Gaffoor, a national monument of Singapore, is also situated along Dunlop Street amongst the shophouses. It has its origins in 1910 when its founder Shaik Abdul Gaffoor, a trustee of the Dunlop Street Mosque Endowment, ordered the construction of a mosque to replace a smaller one that had stood at the site since the 1850s. Some shophouses along Dunlop Street are also owned by the mosque as part of the endowment. The mosque was extensively restored in 2000, which took three years, and was reopened in 2003.

== Transportation ==
Dunlop Street is served by two MRT stations; Jalan Besar and Rochor, both on the Downtown Line. Since March 2018, passengers can transfer from both stations for free without a fare penalty, which allows one to skip the loop of the Downtown Line.

== See also ==
- Rochor
- Little India
