= Mangal Chotta Singh =

Mangal Chotta Singh

Mangal Chotta Singh (died 14 February 1971) was a pioneer in and promoter of Indian dance and music in Singapore. Initially a medical practitioner, he founded the Ramakrishna Mission Orchestra, the first Indian orchestra in Southeast Asia, in 1939. In 1986, he was posthumously awarded the Kala Ratna.

== Education and medical career ==
Singh was the son of wealthy trader Thakur Mangal Singh Gaur. He studied at the King Edward VII College of Medicine in Singapore in the 1920s. After graduating, he established the Mangal Dispensary on Dunlop Street.

== Career ==
While Singh was initially only an amateur dancer and musician, he was the "earliest competent exponent and teacher of Hindustani music and North Indian dance" and "became known to almost every Indian household in Singapore because of his knowledge of, and performance ability in, Indian music and dance." He eventually left his occupation as a medical practitioner to focus on music and dance. Singh remained musically active from the mid-1920s to the 1960s. When poet Rabindranath Tagore visited Singapore in 1927, Singh composed a song for him. He wrote An elementary guide to Indian music and harmonium playing, which was published in 1936. In a paper published in the Journal of Southeast Asian Studies, Jim Sykes of the University of Pennsylvania described the book as an "excellent portrayal of Singapore's multicultural mix, containing descriptions of sheet music for the harmonium, with lyrics in romanised Hindi and English."

In 1939, Singh founded the Ramakrishna Mission Orchestra, the first Indian orchestra in Southeast Asia. He also founded the Ramakrishna Ladies Orchestra. The two orchestras would later merge to form the Ramakrishna Sangeetha Sabha in 1950. His name would later become "synonymous" with the orchestra. Singh was also a founding member of both the Singapore Indian Association and the North Indian Hindu Association. He served as the president of the latter organisation from 1927 to 1928, from 1939 to 1940, and from 1942 to 1945. From 1954 to 1964, he served as the president of the Ramakrishna Sangeetha Sabha. He also served as the honorary treasurer of the Arya Kumar Sabha. In 1960, he headed the organising committee for a concert that was to be Victoria Theatre and Concert Hall in celebration of Tagore's birthday. He also led the music departments of several local Indian organisations. Prominent conductor Paul Abisheganaden and his brother Gerard were among Singh's students. He was "adept" at various forms of Indian music and dance, including Hindustani classical music and North Indian dances.

== Personal life and death ==
Singh and his family lived on Cuff Road. According to his grandnephew, before the outbreak of World War II, Singh would produce music by hitting chipped floor tiles together. He died at the age of 82 on 14 February 1971. In 1986, he posthumously received the Kala Ratna award from the Singapore Indian Fine Arts Society for "promoting Indian music". Singh's grandnephew was presented with a plaque on his behalf. He was one of two musicians to receive the award in that year, along with M.V. Gurusamy.
