= Rochor =

Planning area within the Central Region of Singapore

- Planning Area

Other transcription(s)
  - Chinese: 梧槽; Wúcáo (Pinyin); Ngô͘-chô (Hokkien POJ)
  - Malay: Rochor (Rumi)
  - Tamil: ரோச்சோர் Rōccōr (Transliteration)
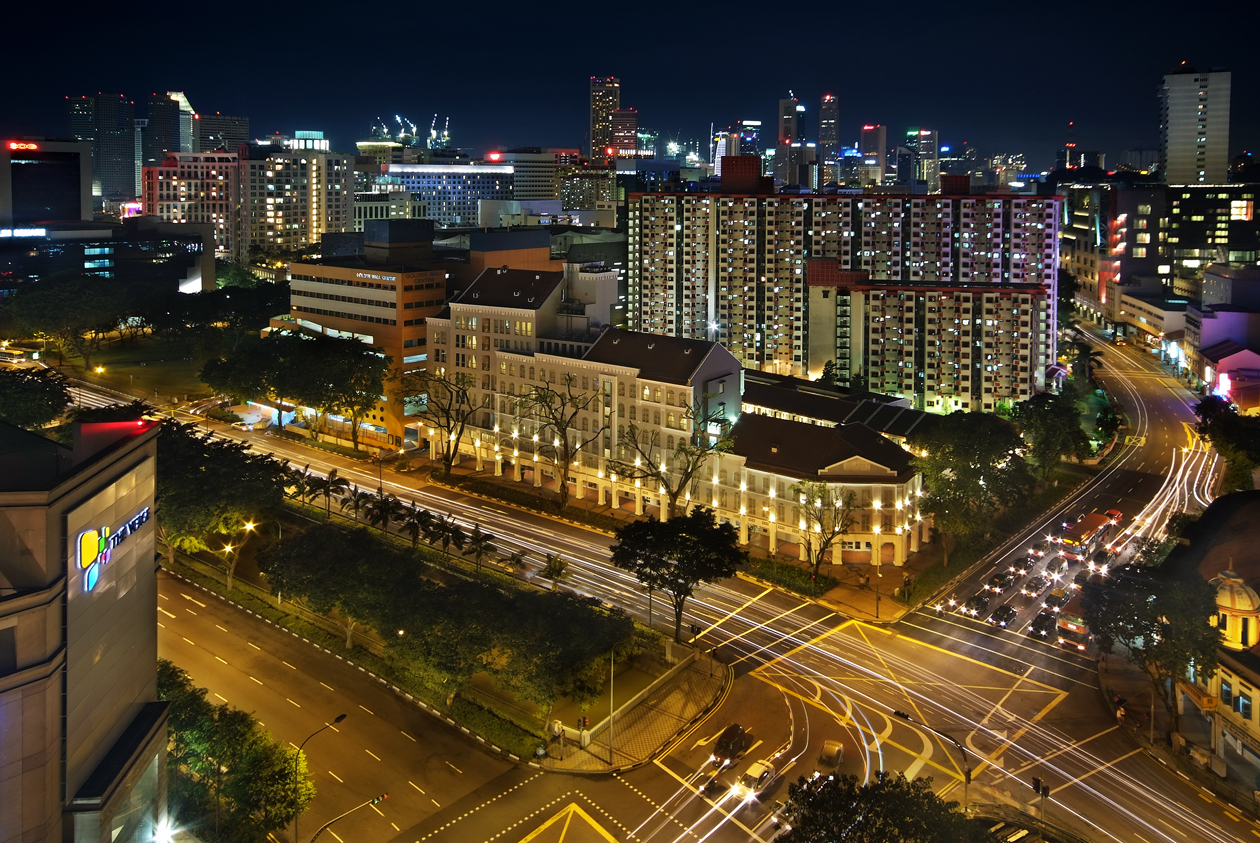
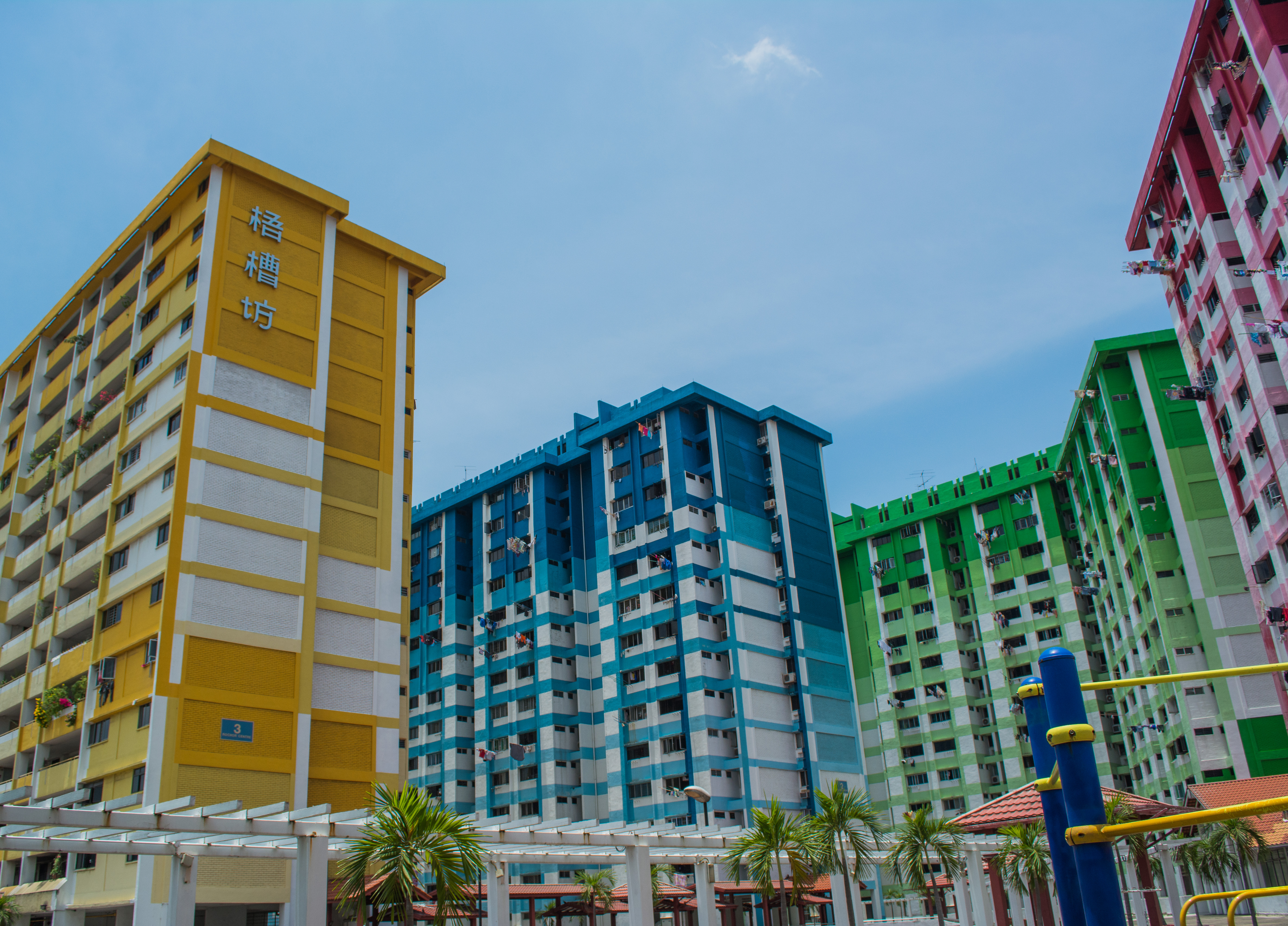
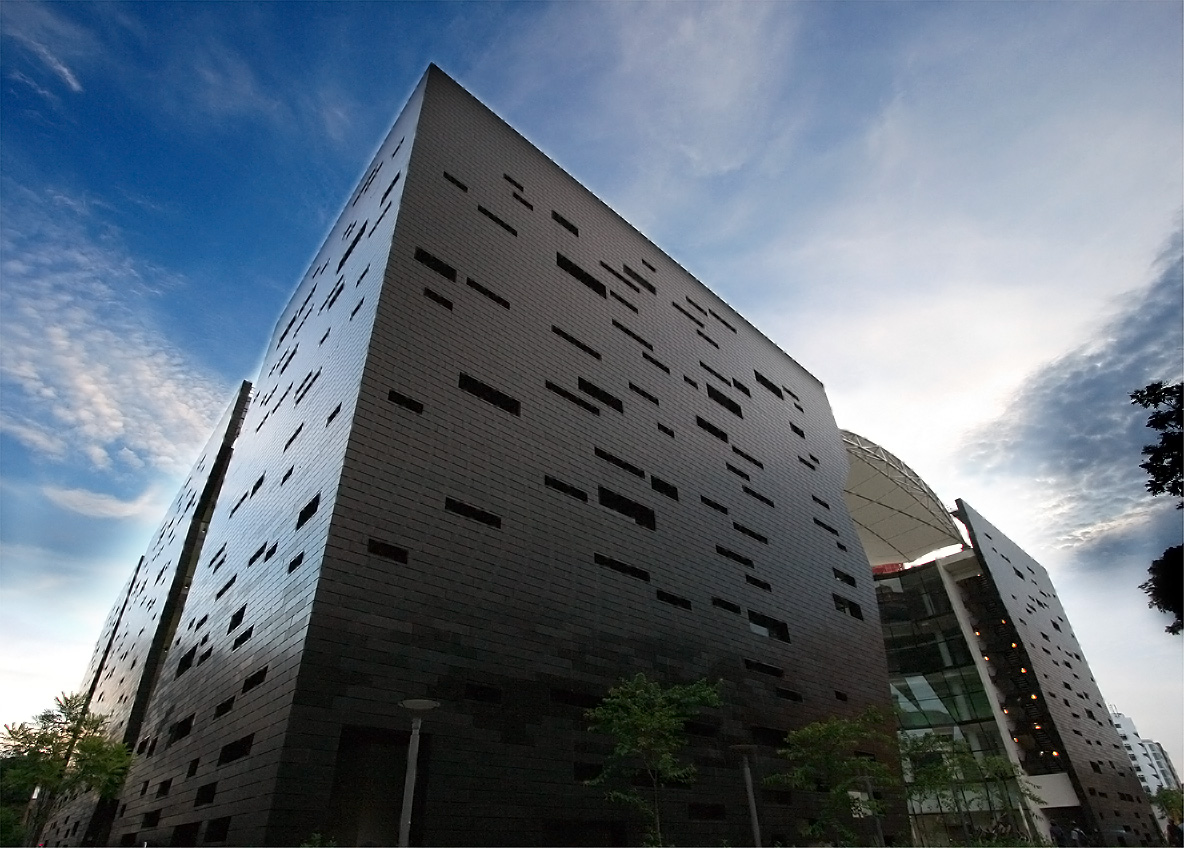
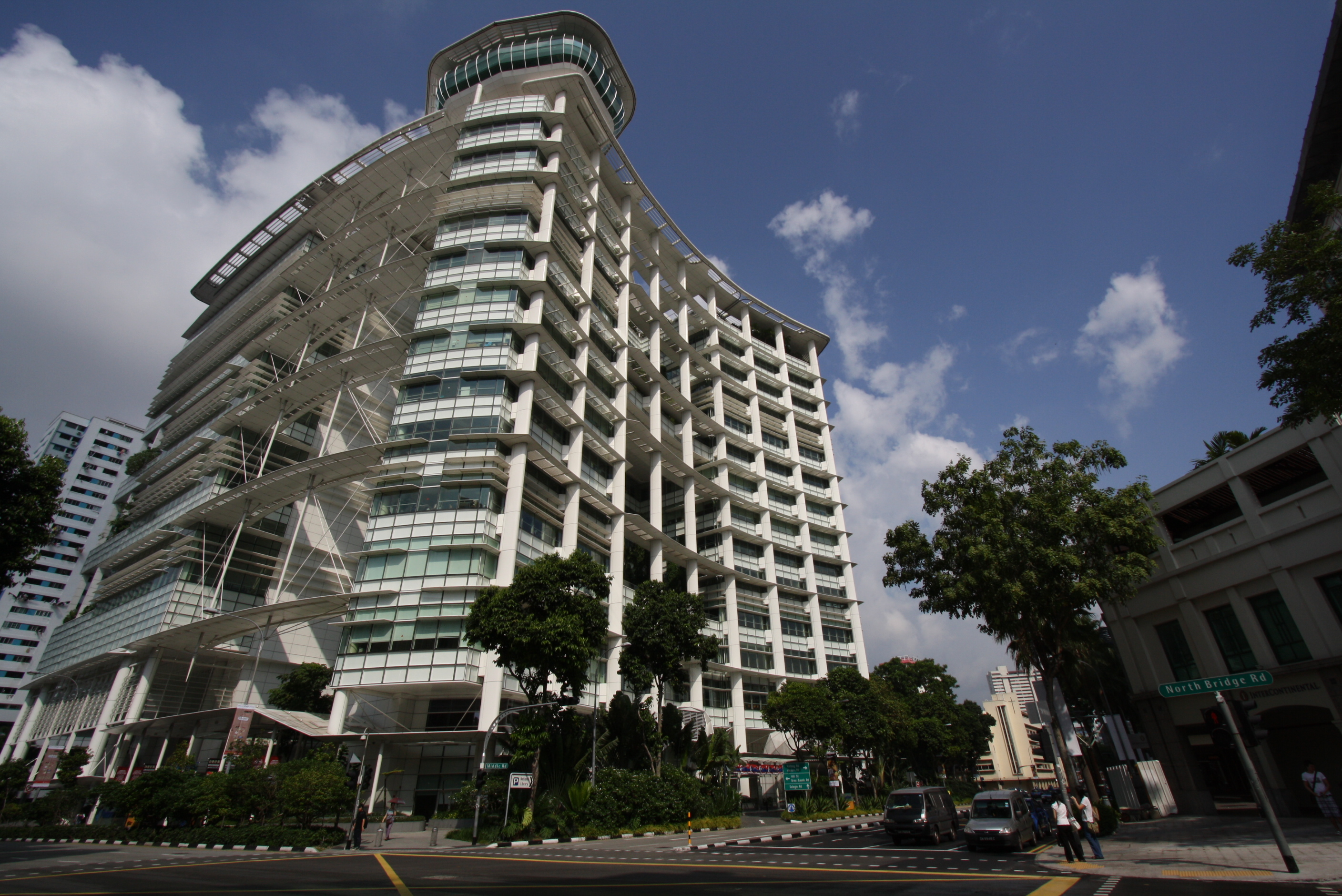
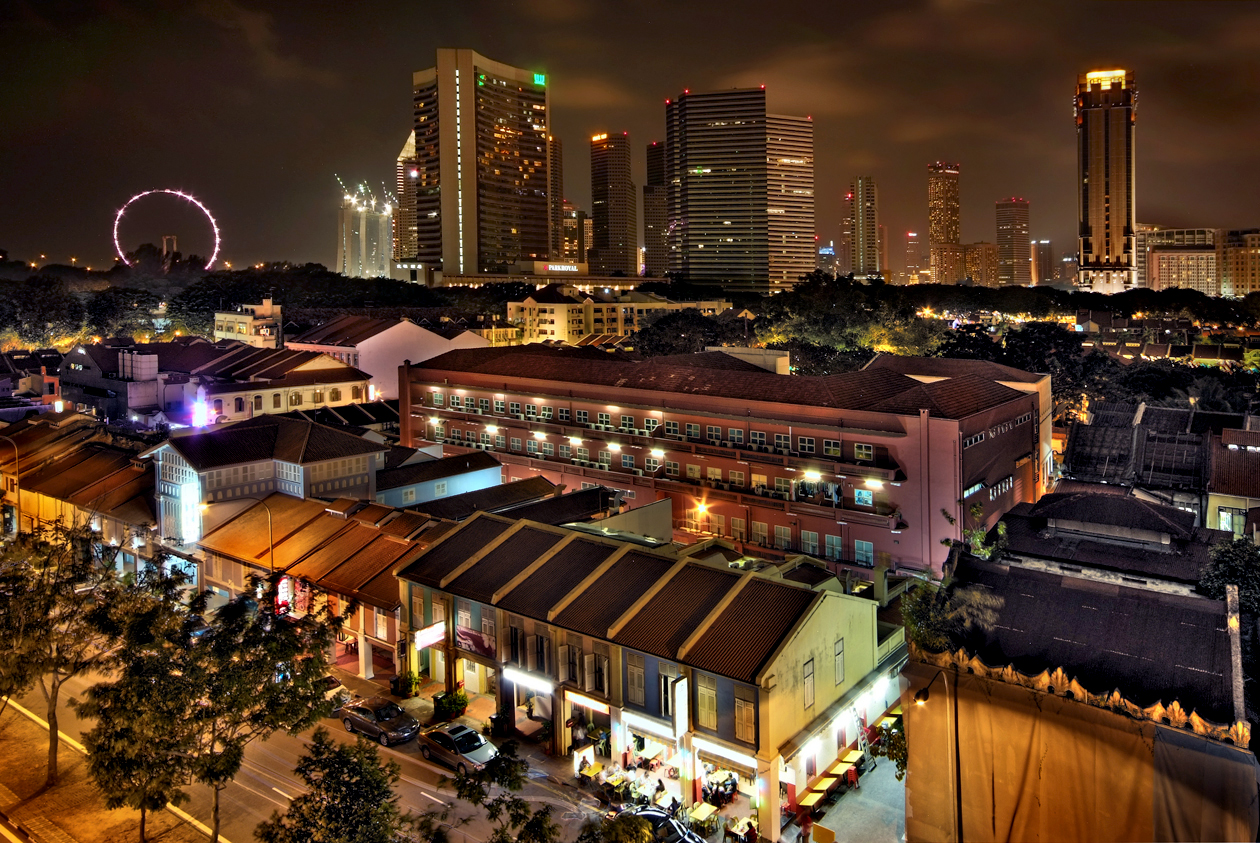
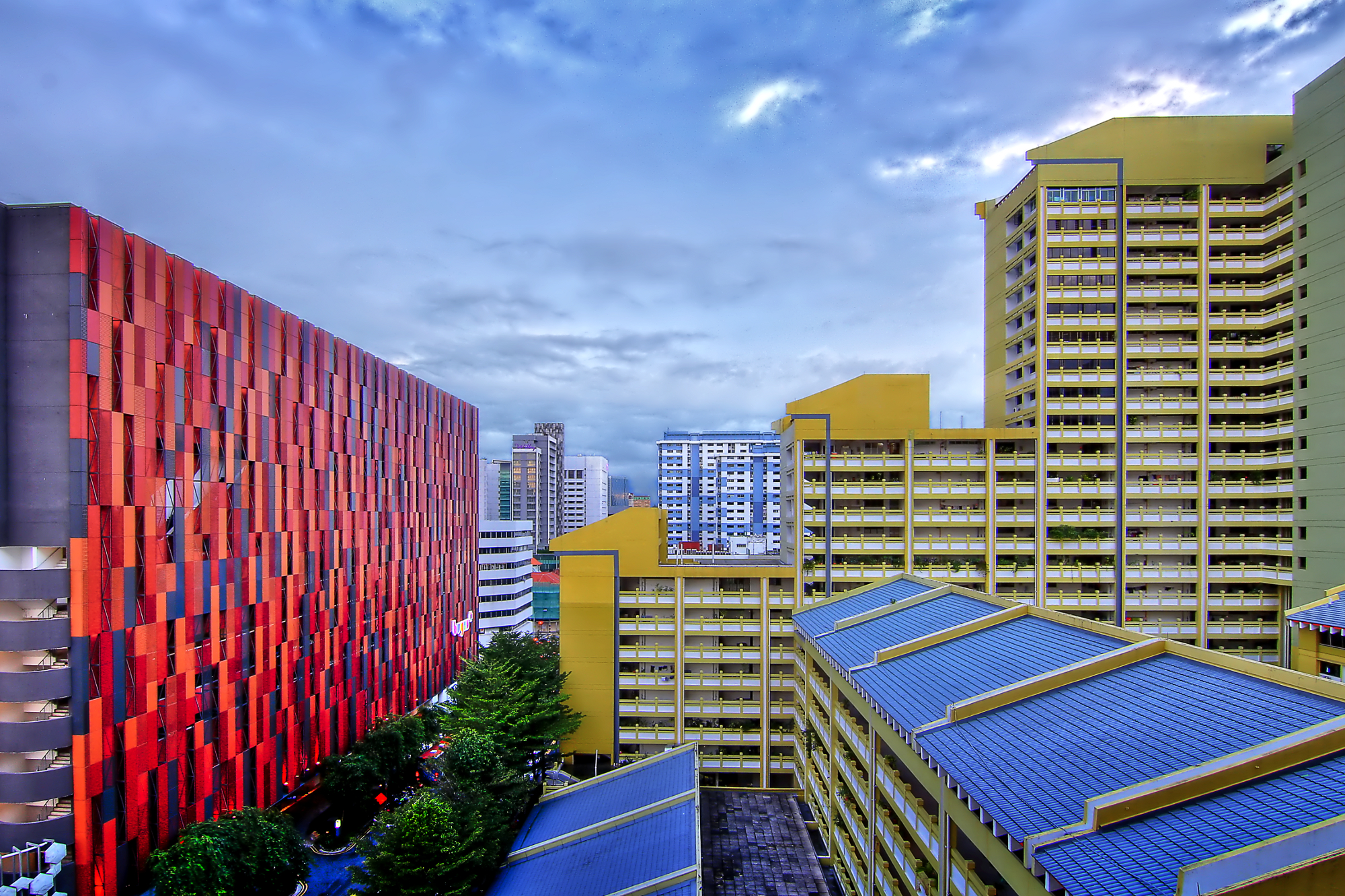
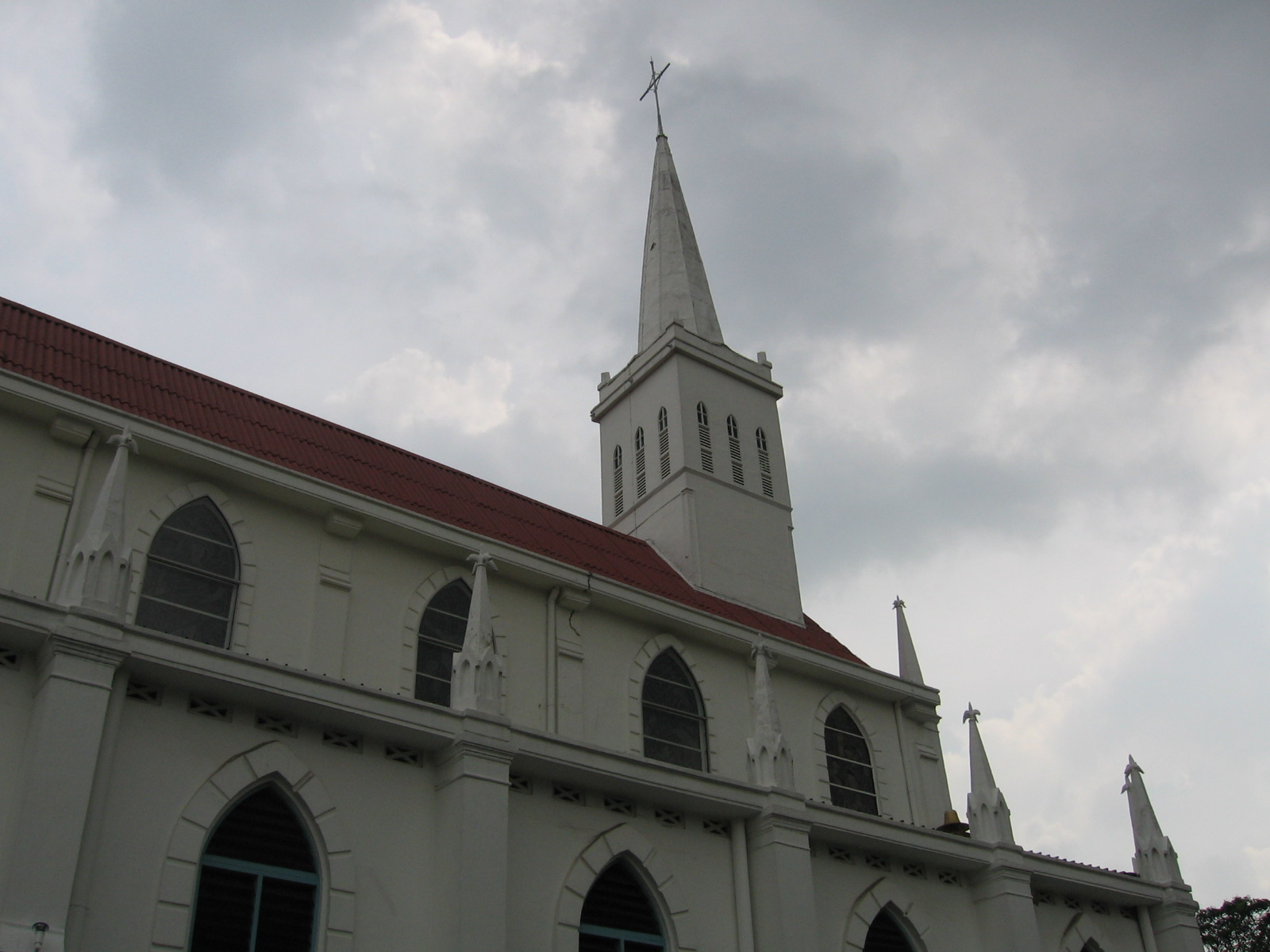
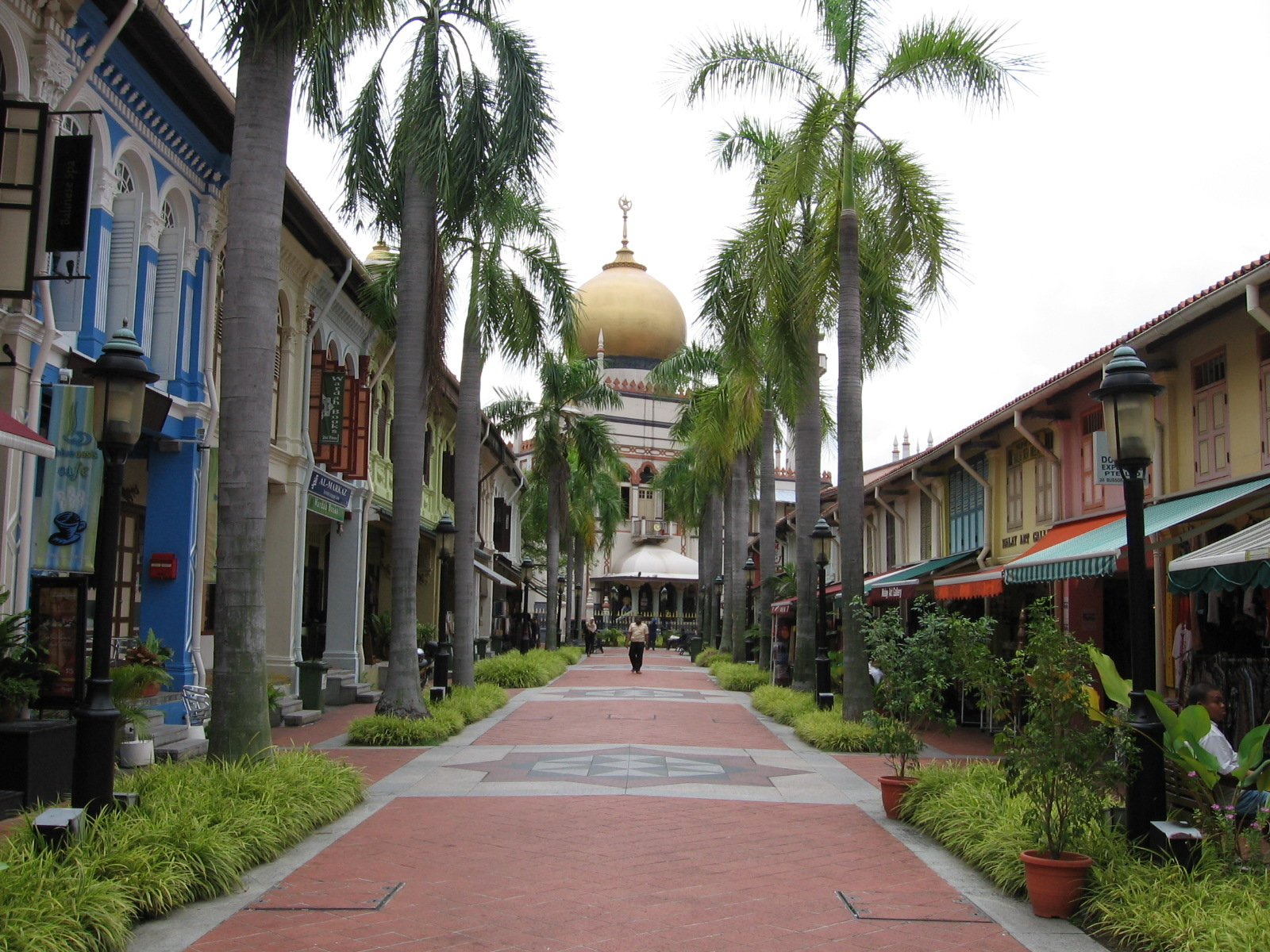
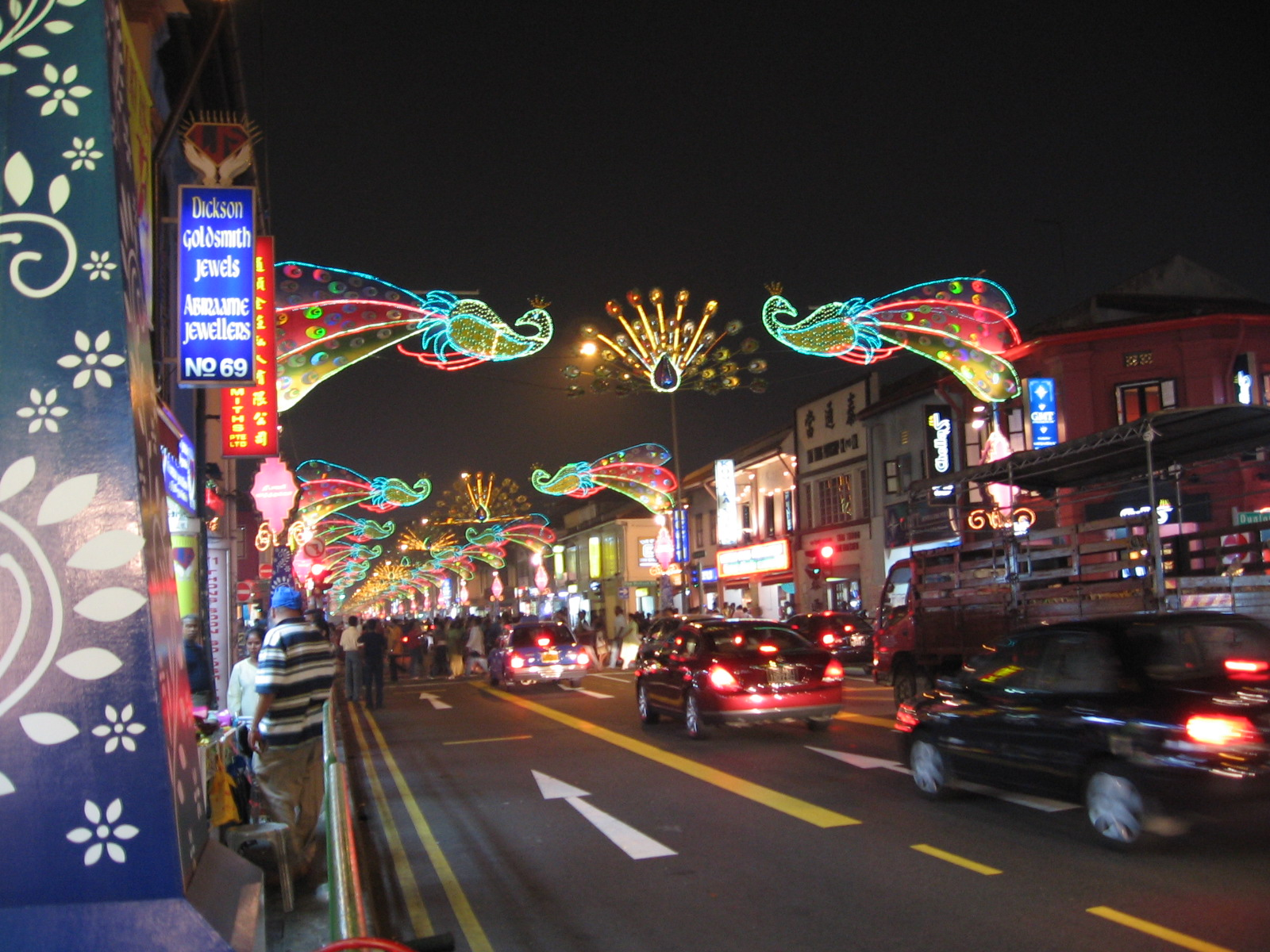
- From top left to right: Aerial view of Rochor at night, Rochor Centre, LASALLE College of the Arts, National Library, Aerial view of Kampong Glam at night, Bugis+ and Cheng Yan Court, The Church of Our Lady of Lourdes, Masjid Sultan and Bussorah Mall, Little India

- Location in Central Region

- Location of Rochor within Singapore
- Coordinates: 1°18′18.4″N 103°51′3.2″E
- Country: Singapore
- Region: Central Region
- CDC: Central Singapore CDC
- Town council: Jalan Besar Town Council
- Constituency: Jalan Besar GRC

Government
  - Mayor: Central Singapore CDC: Denise Phua
  - Members of Parliament: Jalan Besar GRC: Denise Phua; Shawn Loh; Wan Rizal Wan Zakariah

Area
  - Total: 1.59 km^{2} (0.61 sq mi)
  - Rank: 49th

Population (2024)
  - Total: 12,640
  - Rank: 31st
  - Density: 7,950/km^{2} (20,600/sq mi)
  - Rank: 24th
- Demonym: Official: Rochor resident
- Postal district: 07

Rochor (IPA: /ˈroʊtʃoʊ, -ɔːr/ ROH-choh or ROH-chor) is a planning area located within the Central Area of the Central Region of Singapore. Rochor shares boundaries with the following planning areas – Kallang to the north and east, Newton to the west, as well as Museum and the Downtown Core to the south.

Rochor has 10 subzones. These are Bencoolen, Farrer Park, Kampung Glam, Little India, Mackenzie, Mount Emily, Rochor Canal, Selegie, Sungei Road and Victoria.

== Shopping centres ==
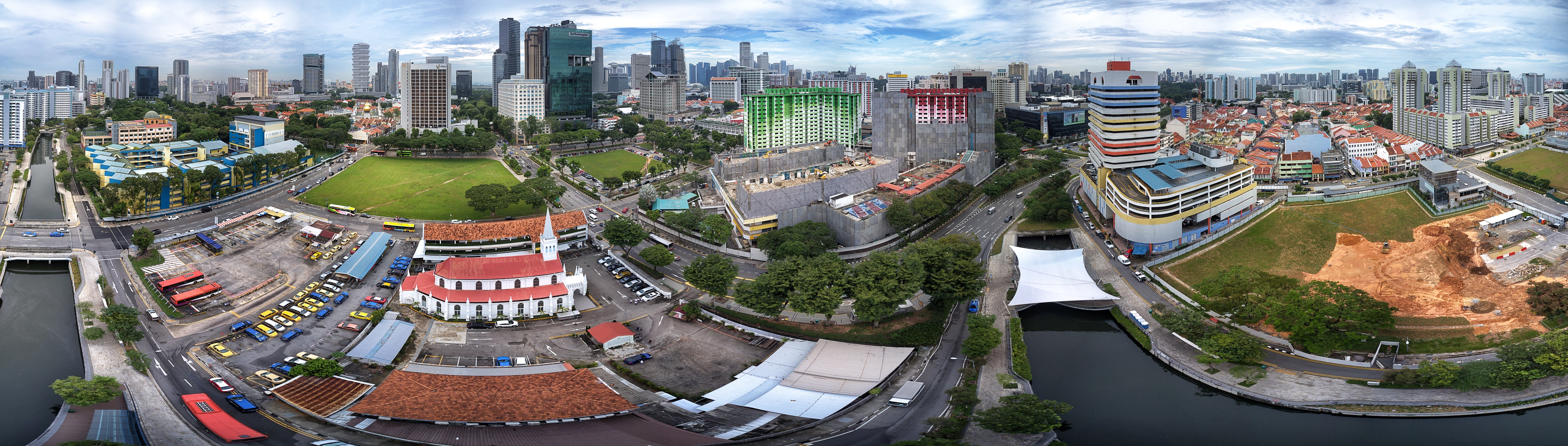
Rochor Planning Area panorama, October 2018

=== The Verge ===
The Verge, formerly Tekka Mall, is the first and largest modern shopping centre at Little India in Rochor, Singapore. It opened in 2003. The Verge has two buildings, the main building and Chill @ The Verge. It is located in the southern part of Little India, with the main building located on the junction of Serangoon Road and Sungei Road and the Chill @ The Verge located on the junction of Perak Road and Sungei Road. Both of the buildings are separated by Clive Road and the mall lies opposite Tekka Centre across Serangoon Road. On 16 July 2008, the mall was revamped, which also brought about the name change from Tekka Mall to The Verge.

=== Tekka Centre ===
Tekka Centre is a relatively small shopping centre in Little India, Rochor.

On the ground floor is a hawker centre with stalls which sell Indian vegetarian meals, served on banana leaves or on stainless steel platters, besides Chinese vegetarian, North Indian and Malay food.

At the wet market which is on the same level, stalls sell fresh seafood, especially crabs from Sri Lanka, and vegetables. There are also many Chinese stalls selling vegetables that are specially flown in from India.

== Transportation ==
Rochor MRT station is a Mass Rapid Transit station on the Downtown line Stage 2 in Singapore, formerly known as the Bukit Timah line. The station links the East West line and the North East line along the Bukit Timah corridor, serving the commercial areas to the south of Little India. This station was originally planned to interchange itself but the plan was abandoned.

== Notable places ==
- 2 Kampong Kapor Road
- Selegie House
- Sophia Flats, a three-storey apartment block of colonial architecture
