= Rochor Centre =

Group of buildings in Singapore

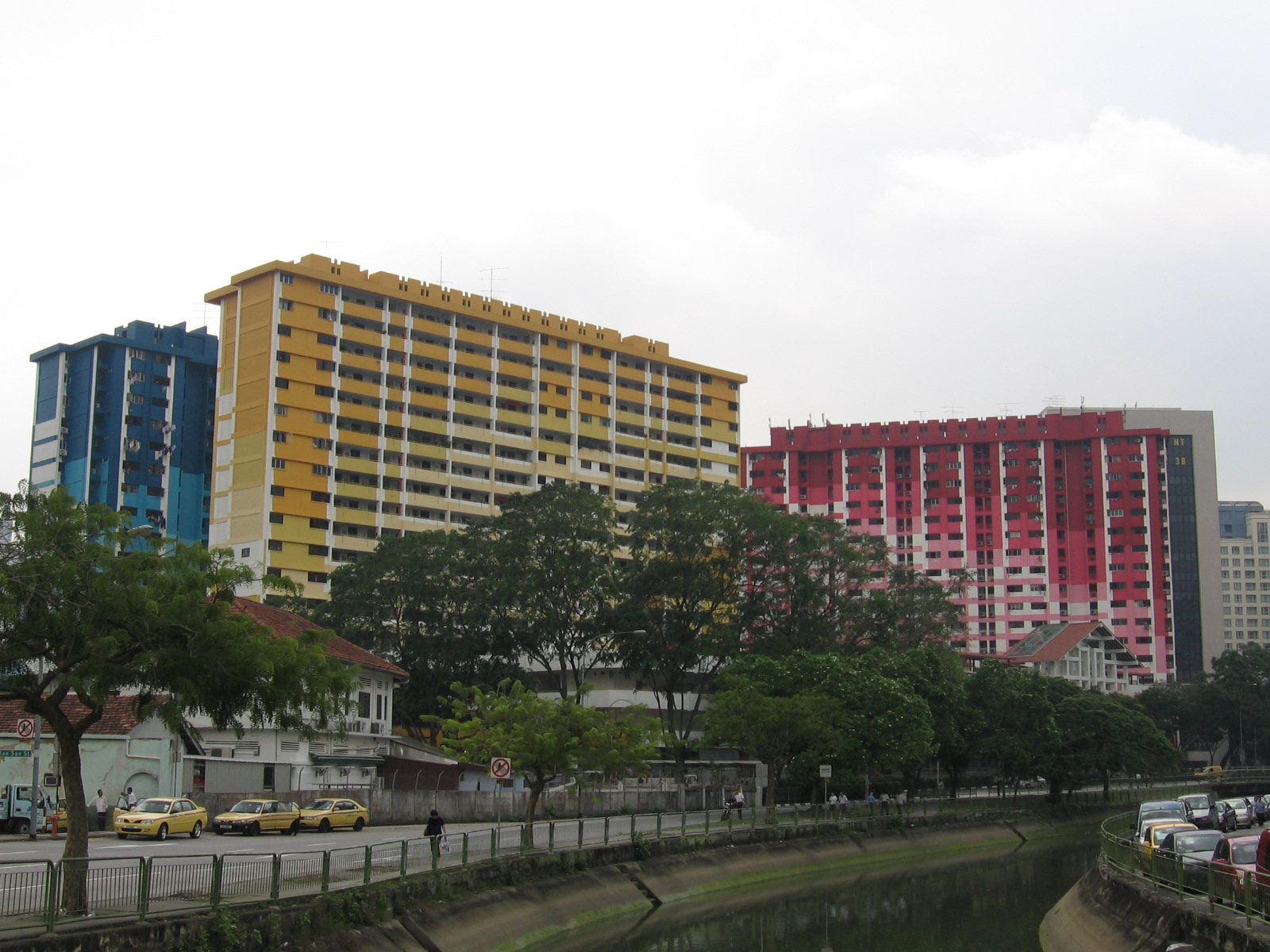
- Rochor Centre from Rochor Canal

General information
- Status: Demolished
- Location: 1 Rochor Road, Singapore 180001, Singapore
- Coordinates: 1.302722°N 103.854918°E
- Construction started: 1975; 51 years ago
- Completed: 1977; 49 years ago
- Opened: 1977; 49 years ago
- Closed: April 1, 2017; 9 years ago
- Demolished: May 2018; 8 years ago–April 2019; 7 years ago
- Owner: Housing Development Board

Website
- Official website

Rochor Centre was a group of buildings in Singapore built by the Housing and Development Board. Dating back to the 1970s, there was an increasing number of people living in slum-like condition with poor sanitation due to the insufficient housing for Singapore's increasing population. Therefore, as part of the urban renewal program under the Housing and Development Board, Rochor Centre was completed in 1977 to take in residents and businesses that were uprooted across the city.

== History ==
=== Background ===
Before Rochor Centre was built, the neighborhood was predominantly shophouses involved in trade and commerce that supports communities of coolies and trishaw riders from Hokchia who have settled there. These Hokchia settlers came from the city of Fuqing in the northern part of Fujian province. In their pastime, they found solace in opium and gambling. As a result, this area gained notoriety for its opium and gambling dens.

=== Development ===
Rochor Centre was also the first housing estate that housed the first old folks home called the Rochore Kongsi Home for the Aged. It was opened in 1977 by Dr Toh Chin Chye, then Deputy Prime Minister and Member of Parliament of Rochor district. According to Dr Toh, the term “Kongsi” means sharing together in Malay and the reason behind this pilot project is that he felt that the aged no longer need to feel estranged from and overlooked by the rest of the world just because they are in their silver generation. As such, the old folks home was built not only to provide a place for the destitute elderly that was found in Rochor area, but also helps to foster a sense of community responsibility in the residents of Rochor Centre.

Similarly, in the same period, the residents of the Rochor Centre had to put up with the strong stench because the night soil trucks had their deposit point located opposite the complex. The night soil collection centre was then phased out in 1987, and has since been replaced by Albert Complex till today. Besides that, Rochor Centre earned its nickname as “Little Johor” in mid 1980s for being a popular stopover for the newly arrived Malaysians who disembarked at the Queen Street Bus Terminal located on Queen Street. This terminal serves as a terminating point for cross-border bus and taxi services between Singapore and Johor Bahru, Malaysia.

Like any other public housing estates, Rochor Centre started its life as some plain looking high-rise buildings with a greyish-white coat. It was only in early 1994 when all the blocks underwent a revamped as part of the Interim Upgrading Program. In the late 2000s that they were then repainted with brightly coloured facades of differing shades of blue, green, red and yellow. Due to its bold façade, Rochor Centre then became an iconic landmark in the Rochor area, listed by the Urban Redevelopment Authority (URA) to be protected.

=== Redevelopment ===
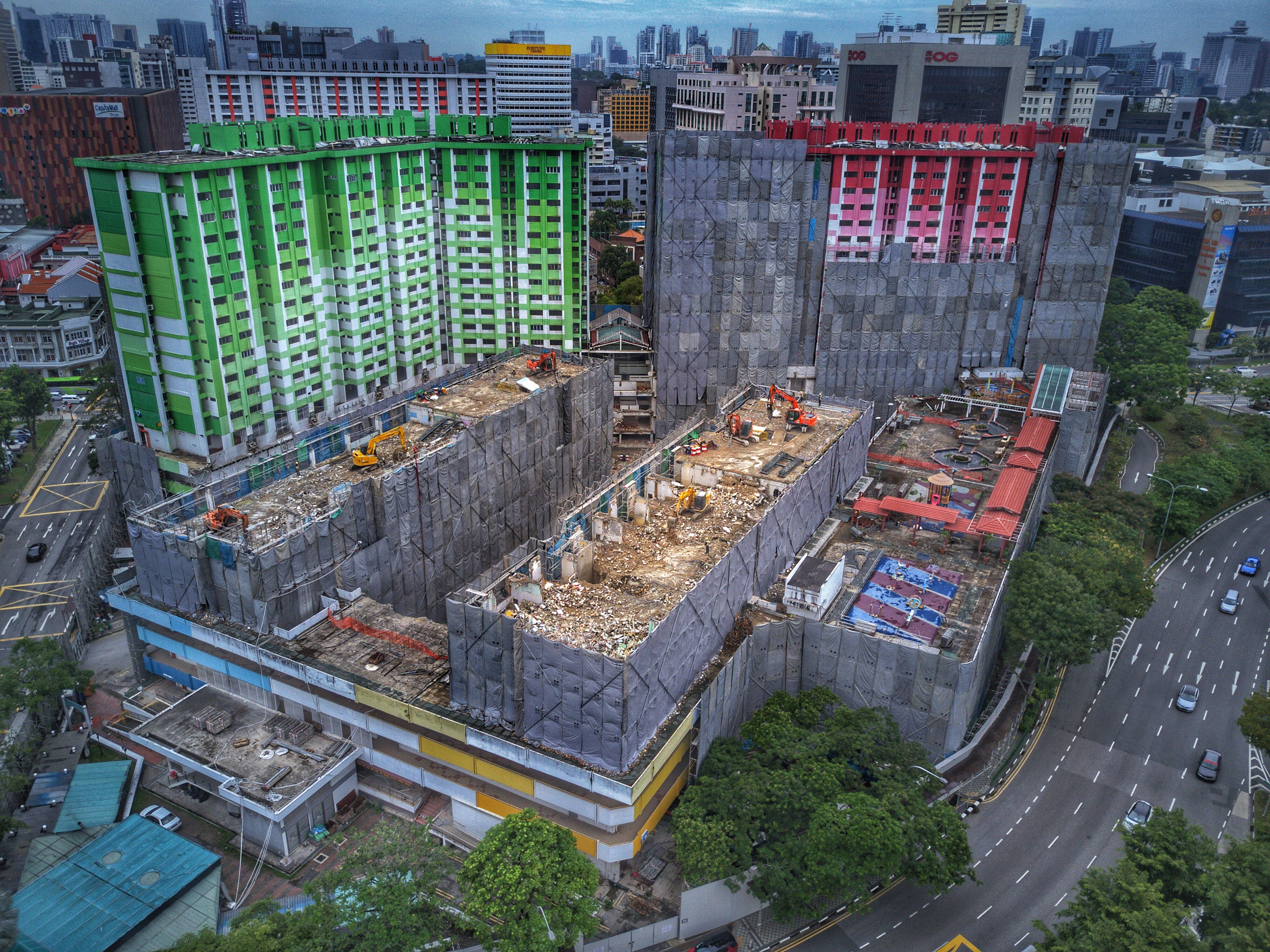
An aerial perspective of the demolition of Rochor Centre Shot in October 2018

In November 2011, it was announced that the Rochor Centre would be acquired by the government to make way for the new 21.5 km North-South Corridor (NSC) and the development of the Ophir-Rochor Corridor. This North-South Corridor will become Singapore’s 11th expressway and connects the northern parts of the island with the East Coast Parkway (ECP) when it is completed in 2026. The hope is this will reduce the burden off the congested Central Expressway, Singapore (CTE) and benefit those living in the East and North of Singapore by cutting down the rush hour journeys by up to 30%. After the completion of North-South Corridor, there will be a new commercial development located at the former Rochor Centre, and it will be named "The Rochor Residences/Offices", and there will also be an integrated transport hub, replacing Queen Street Bus Terminal and named 'Bugis Bus Interchange'.

As a result, the residents of Rochor Centre were then relocated to Kallang Trivista, an HDB development with a mix of commercial and residential activities located on Upper Boon Keng Road latest by the end of March 2017. Shops and businesses were also relocated to other parts of Singapore. As of December 2016, 504 of the 567 households who were living in Rochor Centre at the time of its closure had accepted apartments in the Kallang Trivista complex.

As of January 2016, 106 shops (out of the original 183) had closed while 36 households (out of 567) had moved out. On 31 March, it was reported that shop tenants would be required to move out by 30 September that year.

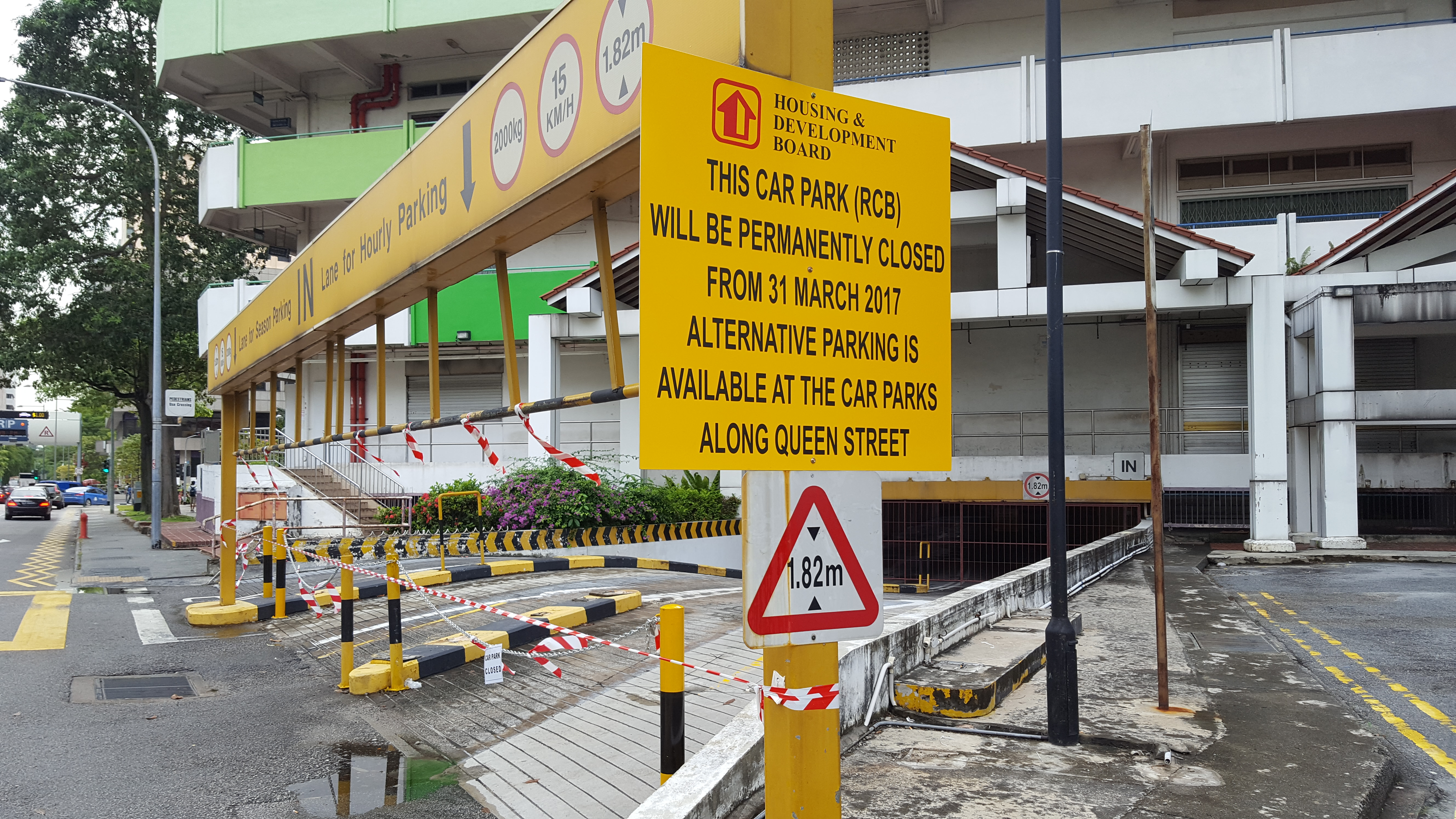
Carpark signboard advising drivers that the carpark will be closing from 31 March 2017, as of 1 April 2017, the entry/exit had been barricaded and the Electronic Parking System removed.

As of 1 April 2017, the entire building had been barricaded and the carpark permanently closed. Pedestrians were advised to stay away from the area since February 2018. Demolition started on 26 June 2018 and completed in April 2019; it became an empty plot of land.

In 2025, it was announced that Singapore University of Social Sciences will be relocated to the site of the former Rochor Centre.

== Architecture ==
Situated on the fringe of the centre business district in Bugis, Rochor Centre left a strong impression on the urban landscape of Singapore with its colourful facades. Bounded by Ophir, and Rochor Roads, Rochor Centre is home to an eclectic mixed of developments. However, the bustling activity of Rochor Centre will gradually fade with its vivid colours into the pages of history as it makes way for the upcoming North-South Corridor (NSC) and Ophir-Rochor development programme. Like many other public housing estates that was built during this period, Rochor Centre was designed in a podium-and-tower style building that originally housed 567 households and 183 shops. The void deck located on the 4th storey acts as a communal space that cater to the residents’ recreational and social needs, separating the commercial units on the first 3 storey and the residential units from the 5th storey and onward.

== Businesses ==
Rochor Centre has over 183 shops that sell a wide variety of goods. Out of the 183 shops at Rochor Centre, 15 were involved in the traditional ceremonial businesses, selling religious items such as joss sticks and candles. This serves as a convenience stopover for the Taoist and Buddhist devotees that regularly visit the famous Kwan Im Thong Hood Cho Temple located 350m away on Waterloo Street. Not only that, some of the shops were relocated to Rochor Centre when Blanco Court was acquired in 1997 making way for Raffles Hospital today.

== Gallery ==
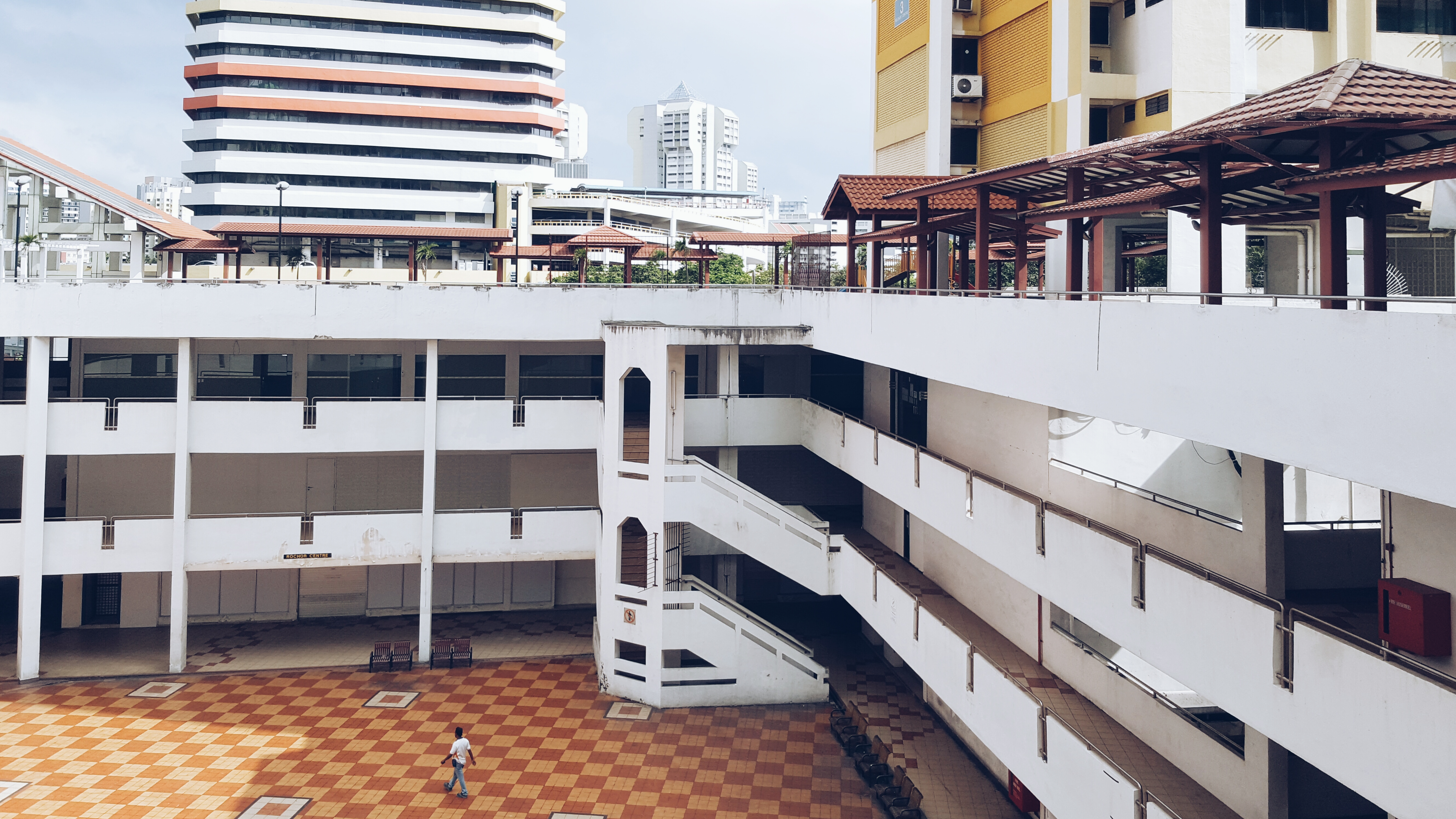

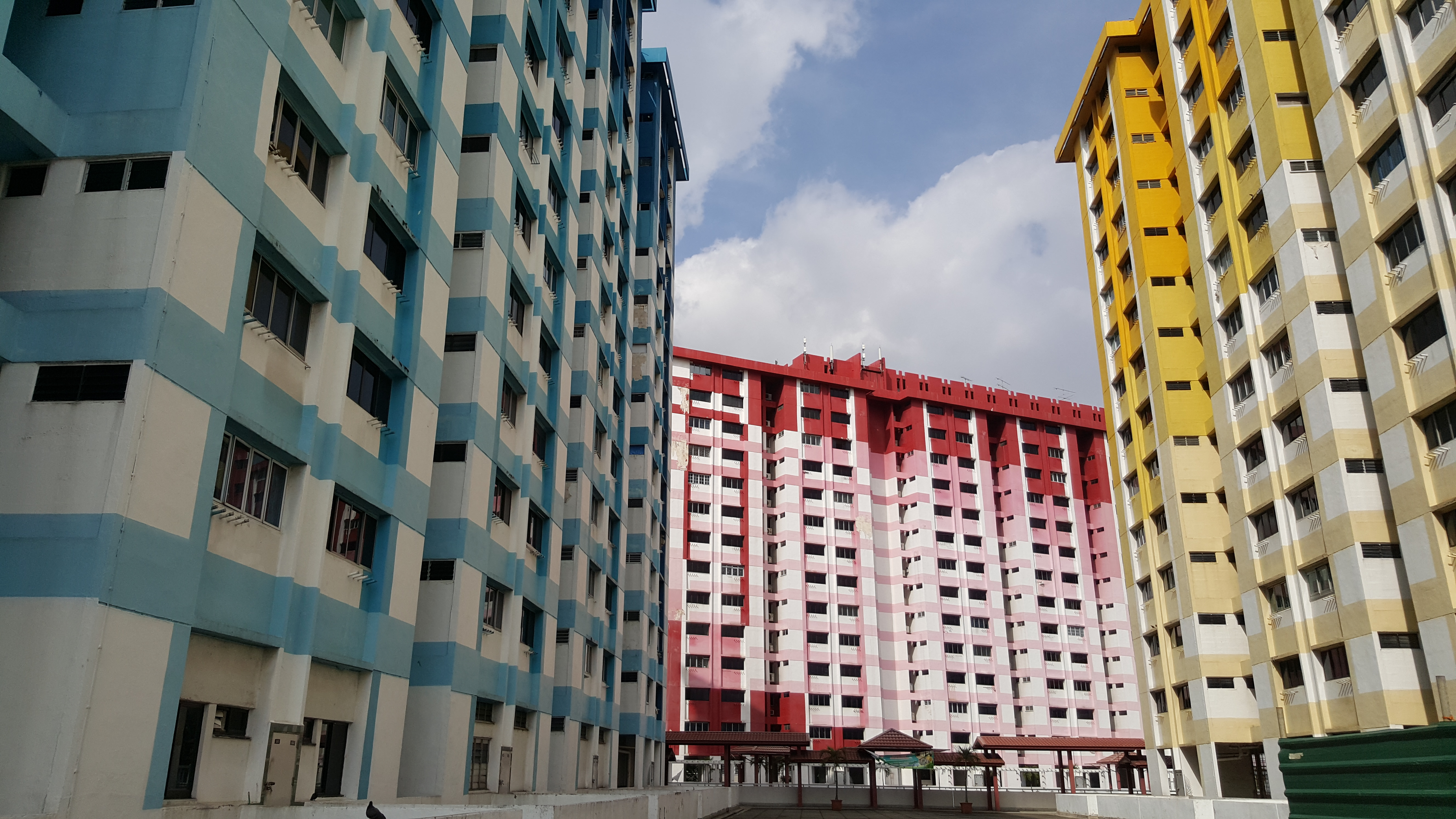

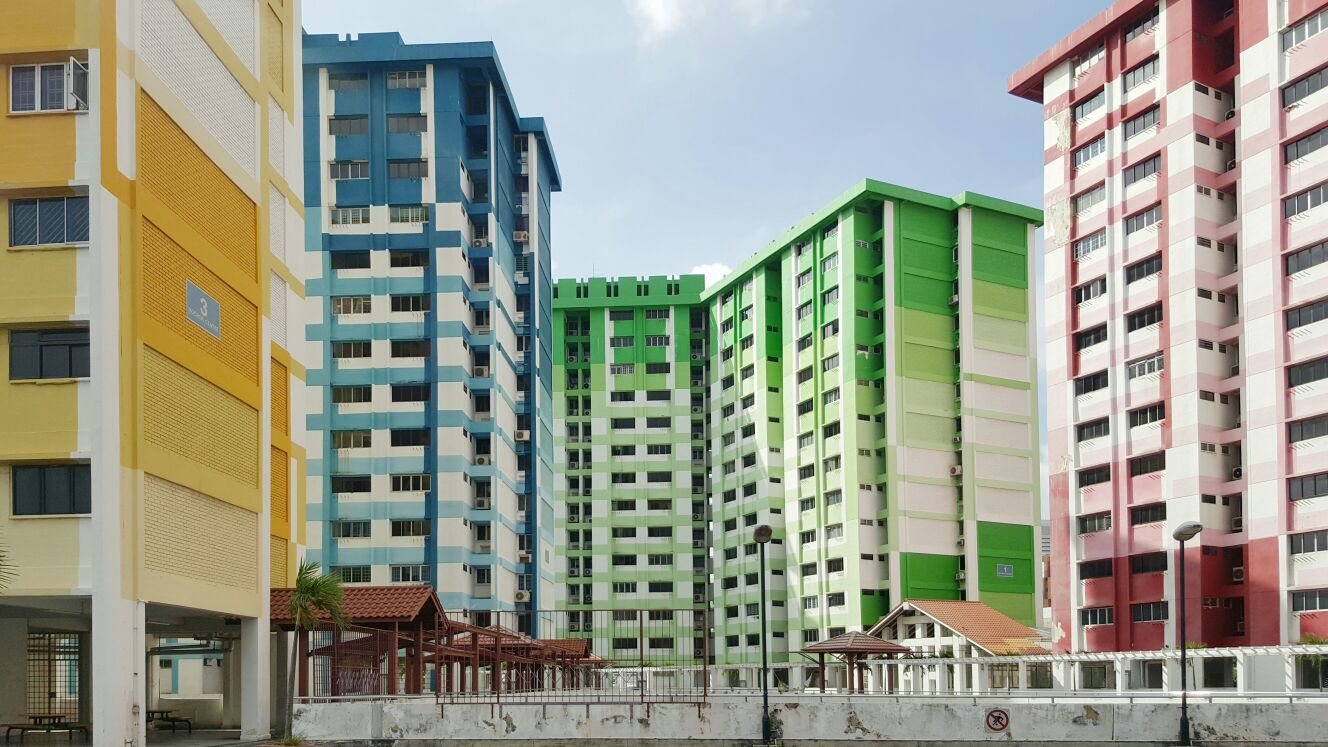
