= Rochor MRT station =

Mass Rapid Transit station in Singapore

Rochor DT13 梧槽 ரோச்சோர்
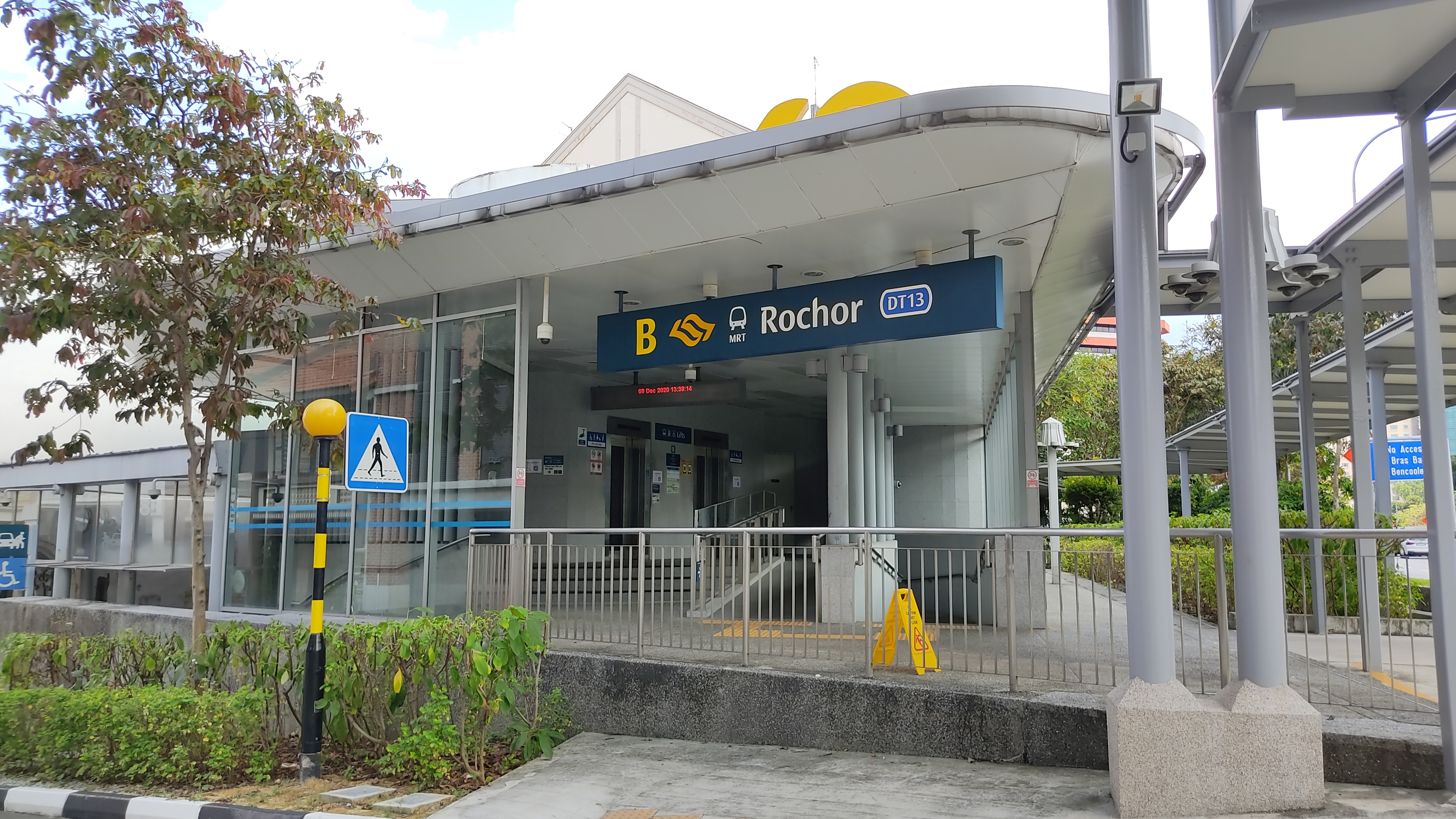
- Exit B of Rochor MRT station

General information
- Location: 11 Rochor Canal Road, Singapore 188505
- Coordinates: 01°18′13.55″N 103°51′9.29″E
- System: Mass Rapid Transit (MRT) station
- Owner: Land Transport Authority
- Operator: SBS Transit
- Line: Downtown Line
- Platforms: 2 (1 island platform)
- Tracks: 2
- Connections: DT22 Jalan Besar; Bus, Taxi

Construction
- Structure type: Underground
- Platform levels: 1
- Accessible: Yes

Other information
- Station code: RCR

History
- Opened: 27 December 2015; 10 years ago
- Former names: Tekka, Ophir

Passengers
- June 2024: 9,422 per day

Services
Preceding station	Mass Rapid Transit	Following station
Little India towards Bukit Panjang	Downtown Line	Bugis towards Expo
Track layout
Location
- Location within Singapore Rail central area

Rochor MRT station (IPA: /ˈroʊtʃoʊ, -ɔːr/ ROH-choh or ROH-chor) is an underground Mass Rapid Transit (MRT) station on the Downtown Line (DTL) in Rochor, Singapore. Located between Sungei Road and Rochor Canal Road, the station serves landmarks such as Sim Lim Square, the Lasalle College of the Arts (Lasalle) and Tekka Centre. The station is operated by SBS Transit.

The station was first announced in July 2008 when the DTL Stage 2 (DTL2) were revealed. The construction of the station, which began in 2009, was one of the most challenging projects on the DTL, involving multiple realignments of the arterial roads and the Rochor Canal while being constructed in soft marine clay. The station, which opened on 27 December 2015 along with the DTL2 stations, was designed by Architects61, and features an Art-in-Transit artwork Tracing Memories by students of Lasalle.

== History ==
=== Construction ===
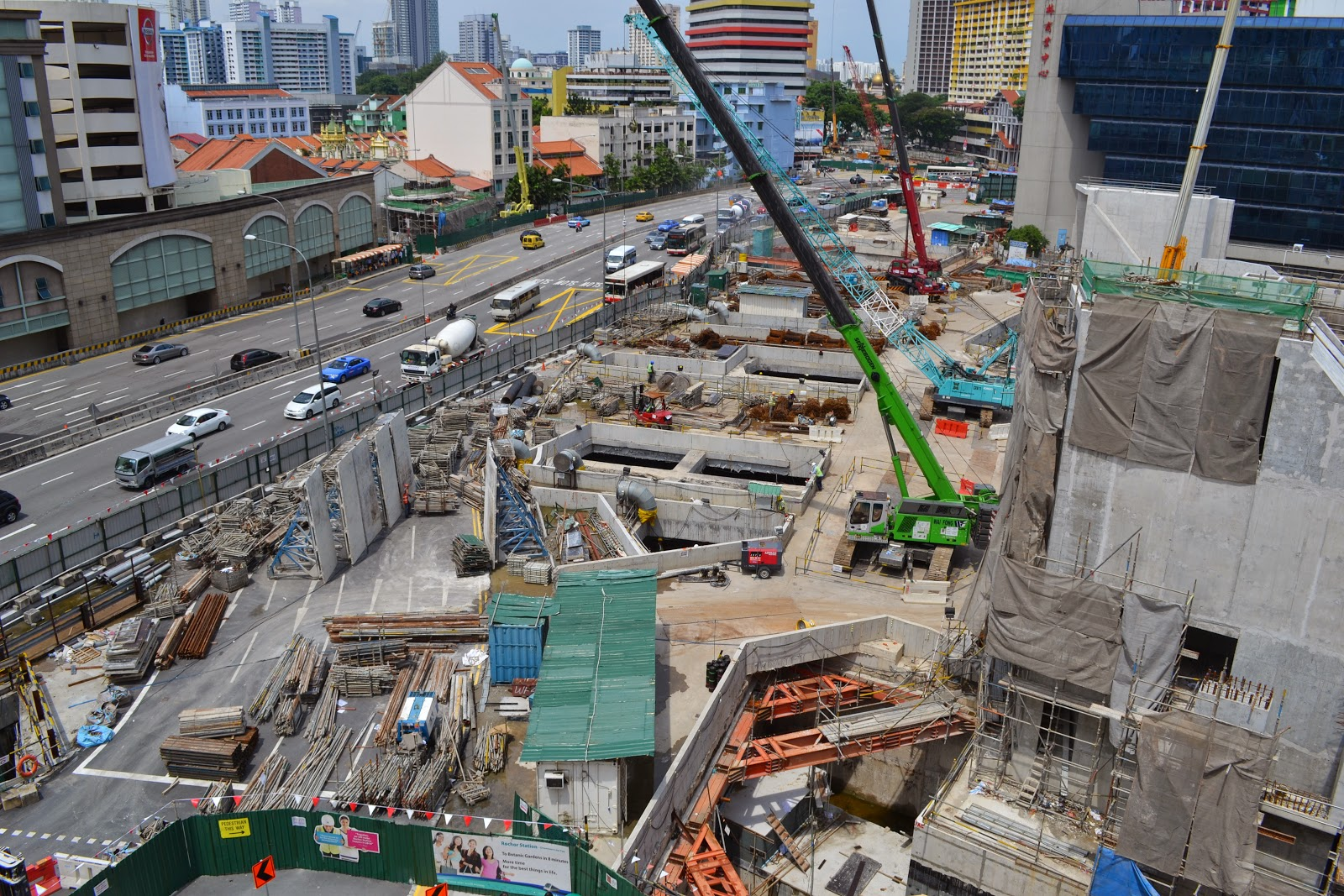
The roads diverted during the construction

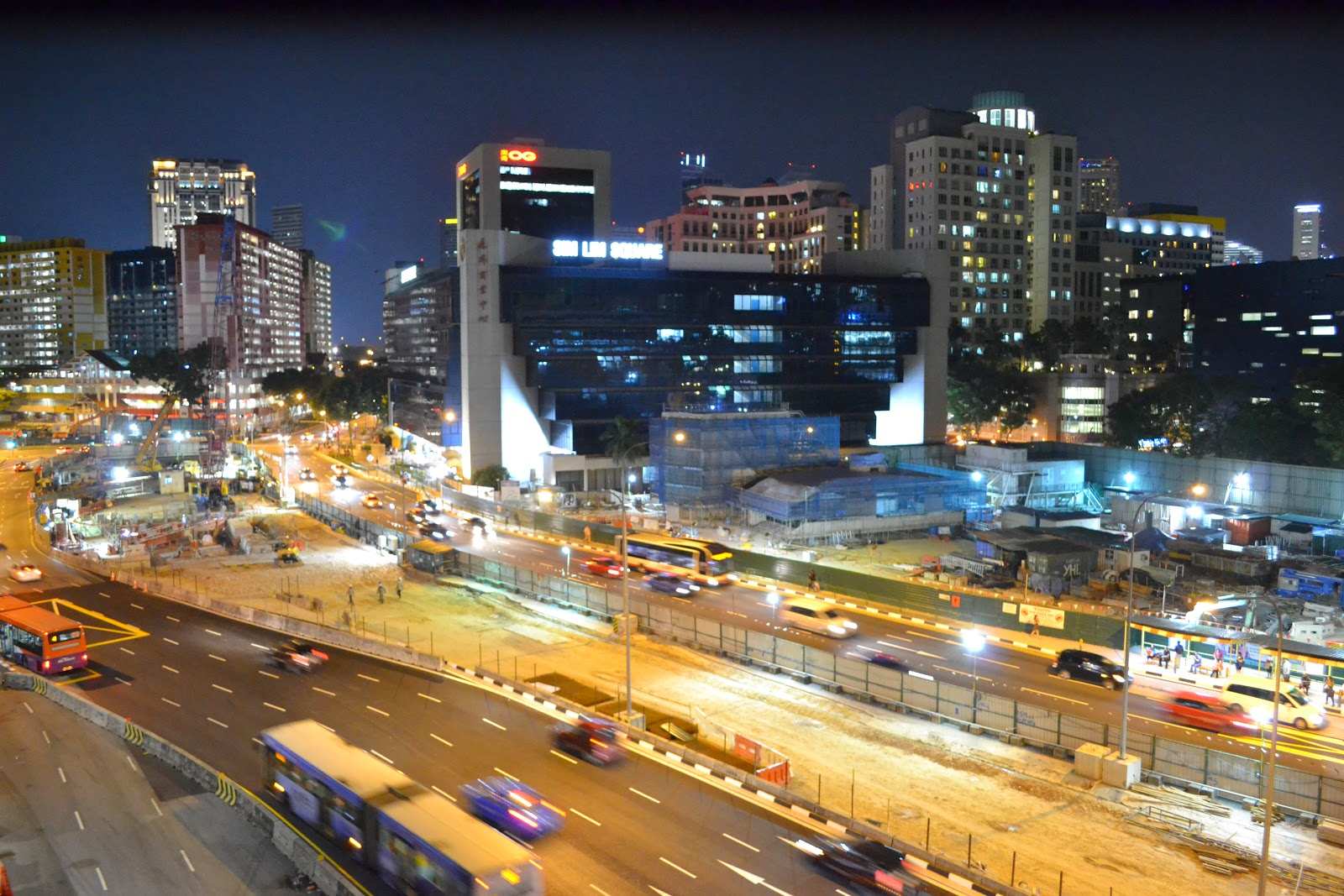
Construction site

Rochor station was first announced as part of Downtown line Stage 2 (DTL2) on 15 July 2008. Contract 921 for the design and construction of Rochor station and tunnels was awarded to SsangYong Engineering & Construction Co. Ltd for S$803.3 million (US$552.3 million) in June 2009. (Note: The contract also included the construction of the adjacent Little India station.) Construction of the station was scheduled to commence in the third quarter of 2009 with a targeted completion of 2015. The contract was one of the most costly to be awarded on the DLT2 project because of the intricacies of the project.

During the construction process, the Rochor Canal, which had previously run between the arterial roads of Rochor Canal Road and Sungei Road, was temporarily diverted to a 150-metre (490 ft) canal box. The arterial routes were rerouted several times. Steel decks for traffic were installed above the canal due to little room to divert the roads sideways. The road diversions were done during the night to avoid disrupting traffic during the day.

The underlying layer of soft marine clay extended 30 metres (98 ft) deep and had a thickness which was described to be similar to "peanut butter". The construction workers erected diaphragm walls and other strong temporary earth-retaining structures, and cement was pumped into the soil to stabilise the soil and prevent any impact on the surrounding buildings, especially the heritage shophouses. Additional equipment was installed to monitor ground movement, while heavy machinery had to be moved carefully to avoid endangering or interfering with road traffic.

With the detailed planning and extensive safety procedures in place, the works were completed in 1.6 million man-hours, on schedule and without accidents. In conjunction with the station's construction, a 180-metre (590 ft) long provisional box tunnel was constructed above the station to serve the future North–South Corridor. The Rochor Canal was rerouted to a new tunnel between Clive Street and Sim Lim Tower, while the canal's original route was covered with soil. In recognition of the complexities of the work, the workers involved were awarded an excellence award by the Singapore Concrete Institute on 20 November 2015. The Ministry of Manpower has praised the construction project for its record of zero accidents and its timely completion.

=== Opening ===
On 28 June 2015, Transport Minister Lui Tuck Yew announced that the DTL2 would be opened earlier than scheduled, (Note: Due to delays in construction over the insolvency of a contractor Alpine Bau, the date was pushed to 2016. See Tan Kah Kee station for details.) with 95% of the works completed. In August that year, Lui further announced that the DTL2 segment would open on 27 December 2015. As planned, the station opened on 27 December along with the other DTL2 stations.

== Station details ==
=== Services ===
Rochor station serves the Downtown Line (DTL) and is situated between the Little India and Bugis stations. The station code is DT13 as reflected on official maps. As of January 2021, the station operates between 5:55 am and 12:24 am daily, with headways of 2.75 to 4.5 minutes.

=== Location ===
The station is located underground between Sungei Road and Rochor Canal Road. The station serves the retail developments of Sim Lim Square, Peace Centre and Albert Centre, alongside religious institutions such as Church – Our Lady of L'des, Kwang Im Tong Temple and Masjid Abdul Gafoor. It is within walking distance to the LASALLE College of the Arts. The station is also close to various hotels and residential developments.

The station is located in close proximity to Jalan Besar MRT station. Since March 2018, passengers can transfer between the two stations without a fare penalty, therefore skipping the loop of the Downtown Line.

=== Station artwork ===
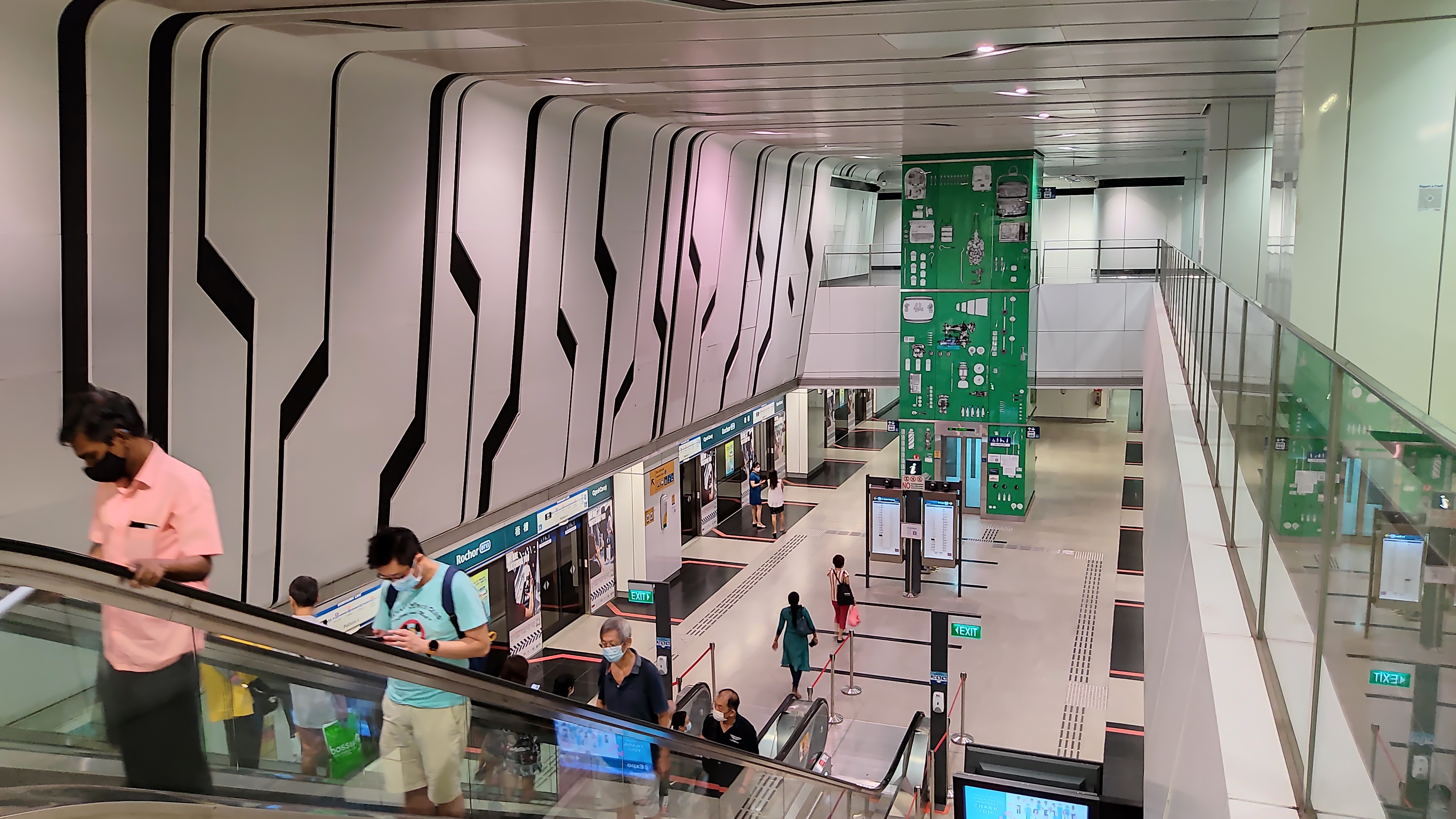
Artwork on the lift shaft of the station

As part of the MRT's Art-in-Transit Programme, (Note: Public art showcase which integrates artworks into the MRT network.) LASALLE College of the Arts students were commissioned to create an artwork Tracing Memories, (Note: The students involved were: Andreas Schlegel, Betty Susiarjo, Chelsea Zhao Xin, Chen Shitong, Luke Heng, Ronald Cheah and Xiuting Yang.) which is placed on the shaft of the station's lift. The artwork depicts local vintage objects acquired at the nearby Thieves' Market, (Note: A flea market which used to operate along Sungei Road.) drawn using pencils, via monoprinting, or digitally and were arranged to resemble a motherboard. The artwork was designed to juxtapose modern technology, as well as the sentimentality for tradition and history, that was contemplated by Singapore's younger population.

=== Station design ===
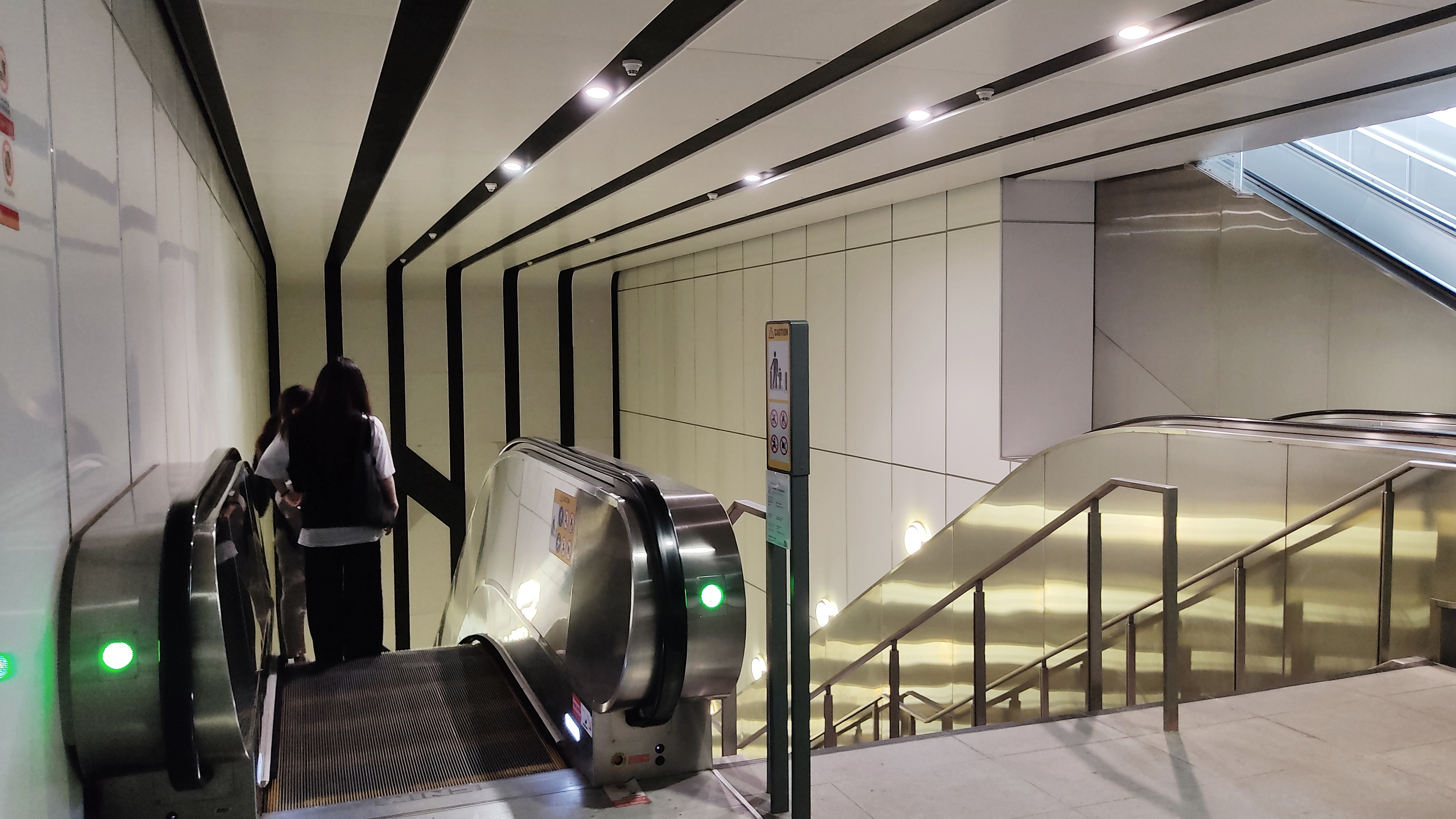
The ceiling patterns act as wayfinding elements for the station.

Designed by Architects61, the station was intended to be utilitarian but aesthetically pleasing, naturally blending in with its surroundings and heralded as a model of contemporary transport infrastructure. Due to its position in a locale known for the arts and technology, the station's platform and ceiling motif takes inspiration from the interior of a circuit board, with the digital lines representing "fluidity" and "dynamism".

The patterns of the ceiling act as wayfinding elements with directional lines engraved into the design. The spacious layout allows ease of movement and improves visual awareness of the platform and concourse. To promote the use of public transportation, the entrances are also integrated with other modes of transportation such as bus, taxis and bicycles. As the site is sloped, the main entrance has ramps to accommodate the height differences. The other entrance (Exit B) features an oval-shaped structure to better resist underground pressure. The entrances were designed to allow future integration with upcoming developments, with provisions for additional underground connections to the station.

== Notes and references ==
=== Bibliography ===
- Feng, Zengkun (2017). Downtown Line: Soaring to new heights. Singapore: Straits Times Press Pte Ltd. ISBN 978-981-4747-66-0. OCLC 1003852882.
